= Joseph Manton =

British gunmaker and inventor (1766–1835)

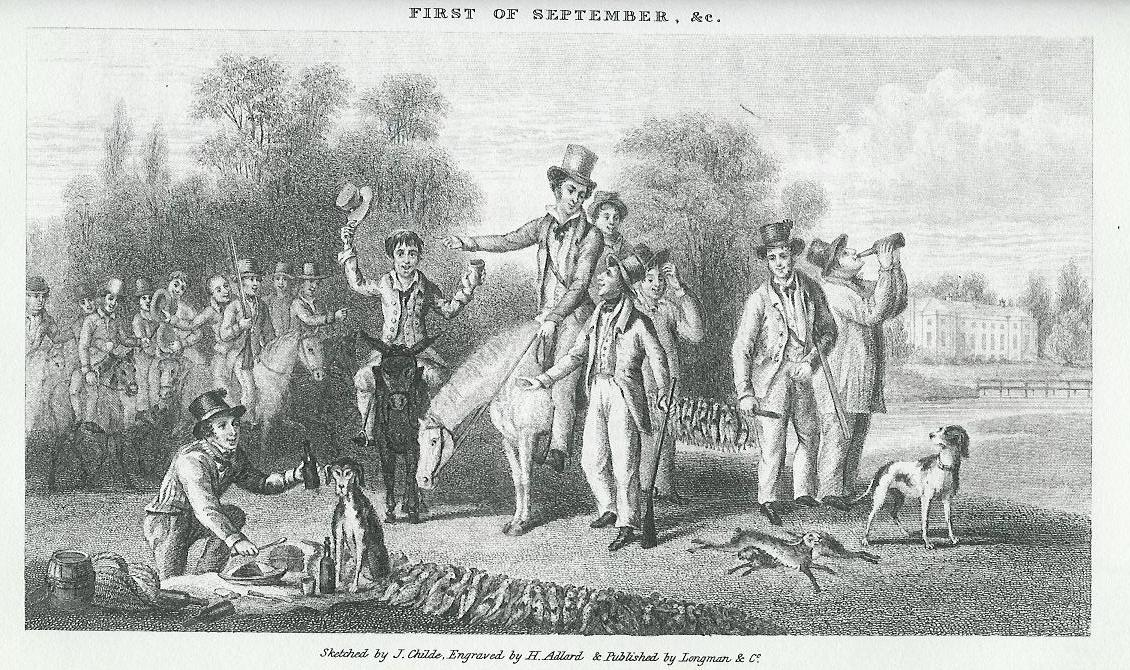
- Joe Manton (stood foreground) talking to Colonel Peter Hawker, 1 September 1827.
- Born: Joseph Manton; 6 April 1766; Grantham, Lincolnshire, United Kingdom
- Died: 29 June 1835 (aged 69); London, England
- Occupations: Inventor, gunsmith

Joseph Manton (6 April 1766 – 29 June 1835) was a British gunsmith. He innovated sport shooting, improved weapon quality and paved the way for the modern artillery shell. Manton was a sport shooter and a friend of Colonel Peter Hawker.

== Gunsmith ==
From 1780 to 1781, Manton was first apprenticed to a gunmaker in Grantham, Newton. He worked under his elder brother John from 1781 onward. He produced around 100 weapons annually, including both cased duelling pistols and shotguns.

== Tube lock ==
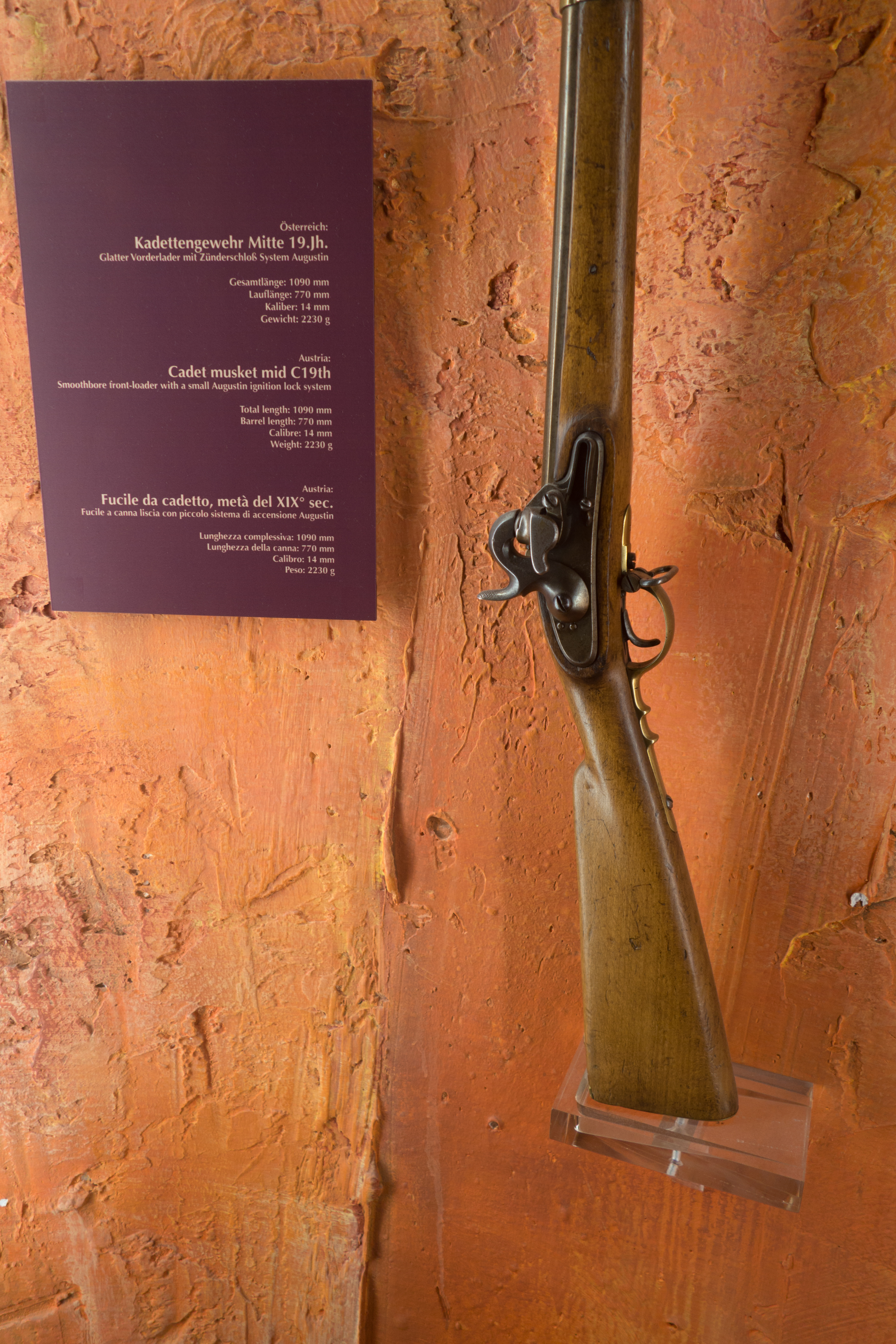
Austrian cadet musket with Manton's tube lock.

In the early-19th century, Manton invented the tube (or pill) lock, an improvement over Alexander Forsyth's scent-bottle lock. It used single-use pellets or pills in place of storing a reserve of fulminate in a container. The hammer of the gun was sharpened; when it fell, it crushed the tube/pellet, causing the fulminates to detonate.

Although more reliable than Forsyth's design and adopted by many sportsmen during the Regency period (and a variant for the Austrian army, in Console and Augustin percussion muskets), it was quickly overshadowed by the percussion cap, which was adopted by the armies of Britain, France, Russia, and America to replace the flintlock.

== Artillery ==
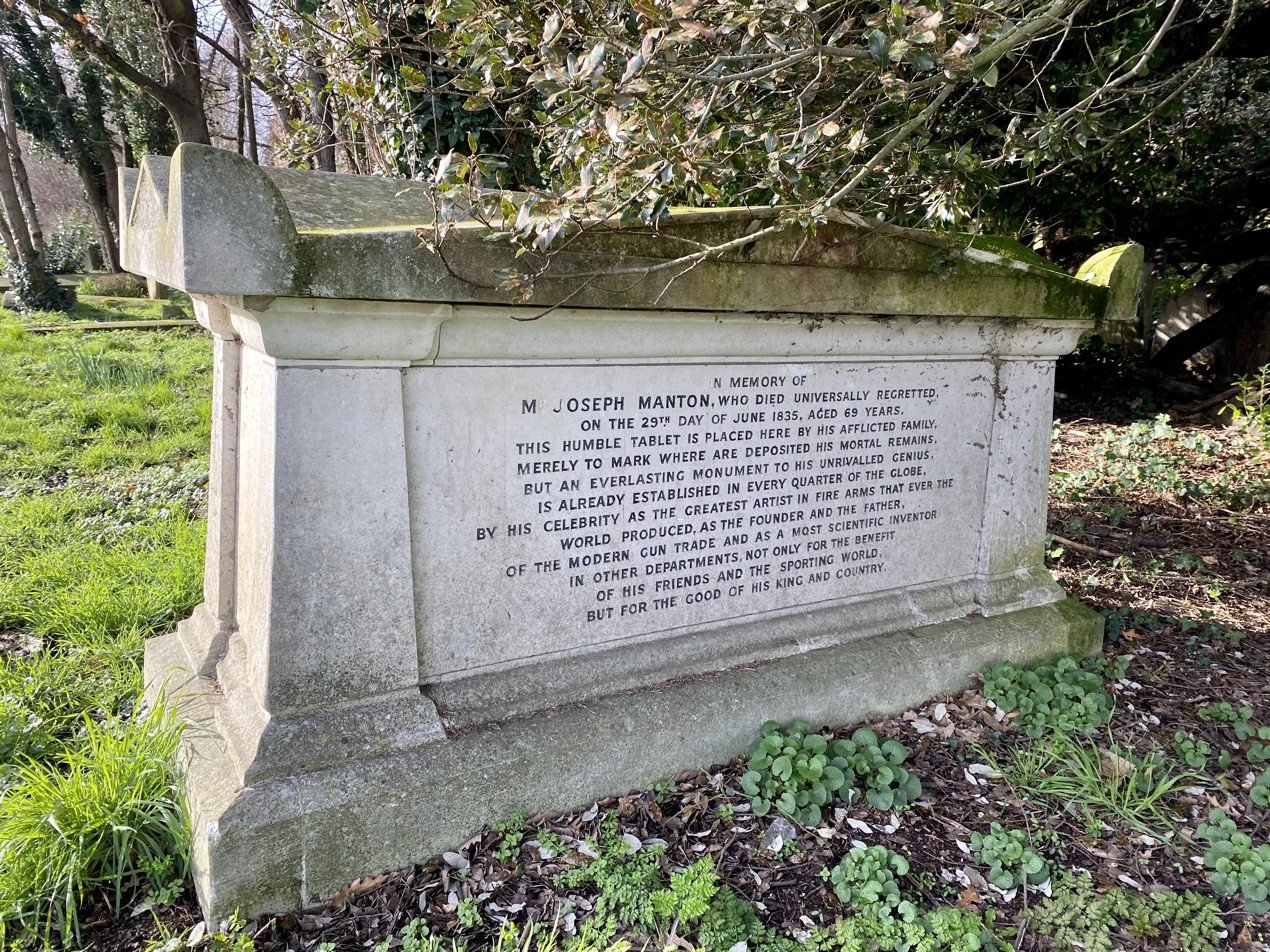
Manton's tomb at Kensal Green Cemetery in 2024

The greater part of Manton's career was spent at loggerheads with the British Army. Manton interested the army in purchasing a larger version of his wooden cup design to be used in rifled artillery.

Manton worked tirelessly to improve cannon firing accuracy. He created a new type of ammunition. He advocated the use of a disposable cartridge instead of loose powder, which became the basis for modern bullet design. It helped pave the way for breech-loading weaponry.

=== Lost sale ===
The army provided Manton a cannon and funding, and in return expected a greatly improved weapon. Manton's design was superior, although an argument over payment caused the army to declare it of little benefit. A row erupted over how Manton was to be paid; he believed the agreement was to be a £30,000 lump sum. The army argued that since they had already invested money (sunk costs) into research and development, they did not want to pay such a huge amount of money for a design that had not been field tested. Manton patented his design, forcing the Army to negotiate. The army offered him one farthing for each shell they produced, but Manton refused this offer. Surprisingly for Manton, the army stood its ground. Manton was frightened that he had spent time and money developing a weapon that the army would not use. The Army rejected his offer, whereby the army could make the shells without paying royalties, while Manton would make the wooden cups. His design was more reliable than Forsyth's design and adopted by many sportsmen during the Regency period (and by the Austrian army).

After more than a decade of unsuccessful legal battles, Manton lost his fortune and was declared bankrupt in 1826. His Oxford Street workshop was seized and his stock of guns bought by Joseph Lang, an aspiring gun dealer whose company would eventually become part of Atkin, Grant and Lang. Lang is credited with opening one of the first shooting schools in the premises adjoining the Royal Theatre Haymarket.

== Legacy ==
Manton's weapons remain some of the most highly sought-after designs of the flintlock age and can fetch more at auction than Holland & Holland's shotguns. His workforce included James Purdey (who went on to found Purdey's), Thomas Boss, William Greener, Charles Lancaster and William Moore. These five established major gun firms.
