= Nipple wrench =

Nipple wrench can refer to:

- Spoke wrench, a tool for tightening wheel spokes
- Nipple wrench (plumbing), a plumbing tool
- Nipple wrench (black powder), a black-powder firearm tool
