= Tube lock =

Firearm mechanism

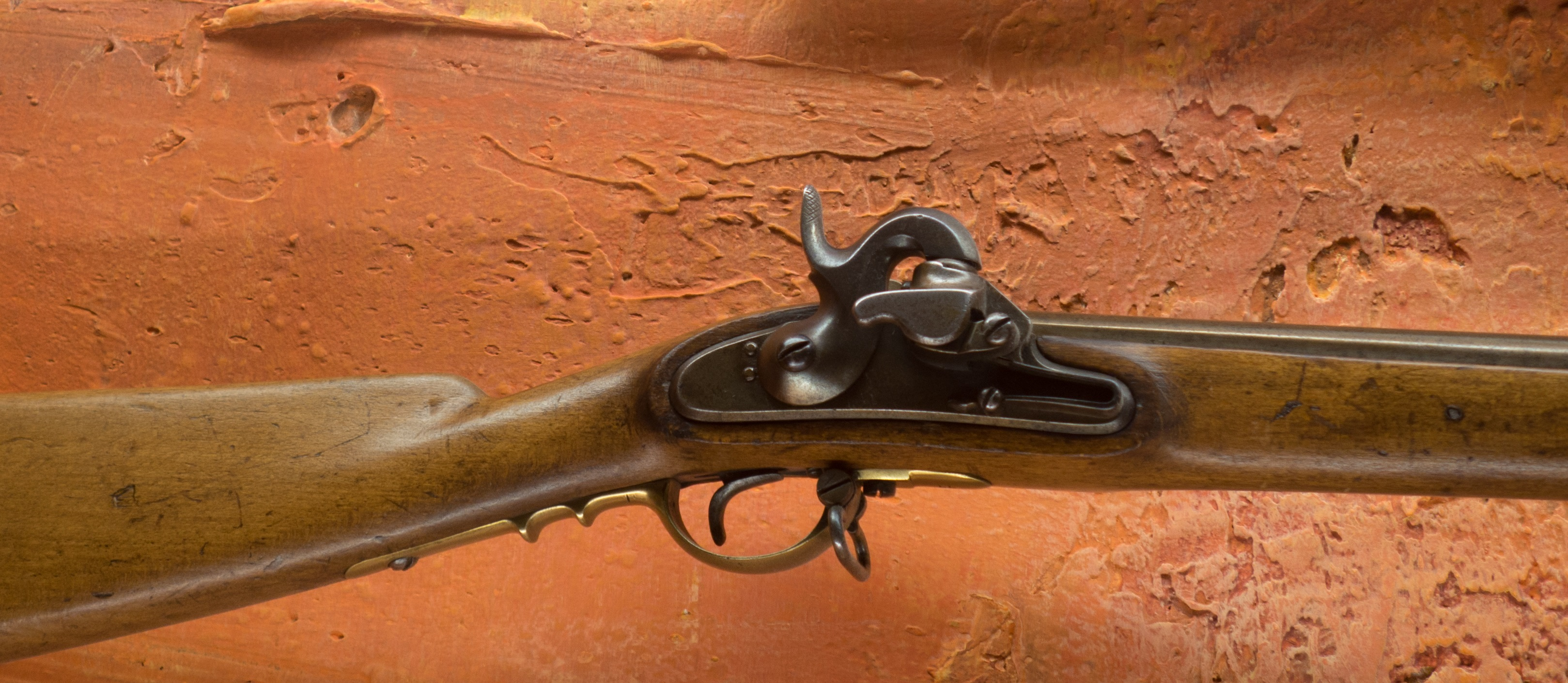
Austrian military school musket with an Augustine tube lock.

Tube lock (ger. Zünderschloss) was an early form of percussion lock mechanism, invented in 1818. It used percussion tubes placed directly in the priming pan and activated with a blow of the hammer, instead of the more advanced percussion caps. It was used extensively in Austria in 1835-1854 for military weapons (Console and Augustin percussion muskets).

== History ==
=== Invention ===
The advantages of the percussion lock over the older flintlock mechanism led to its adoption in most European countries between 1825 and 1840, for military and hunting rifles. The first known tube lock percussion mechanism was patented in 1818 by the English gunsmith Joseph Manton, slightly earlier than the first percussion cap, patented by the American Joshua Shaw in 1822. Tube lock system used small metallic tubes filled with mercury fulminate, which were inserted into the priming pan and activated by the strike of the hammer. During 1820s tube lock was quite popular in the civilian market for the hunting rifles, but the caplock was deemed superior for the military weapons. In Austria, however, in 1830. the official military commission rejected the percussion cap as unsuitable for war and too small and tiny for the soldier's hands.

=== Console percussion lock ===
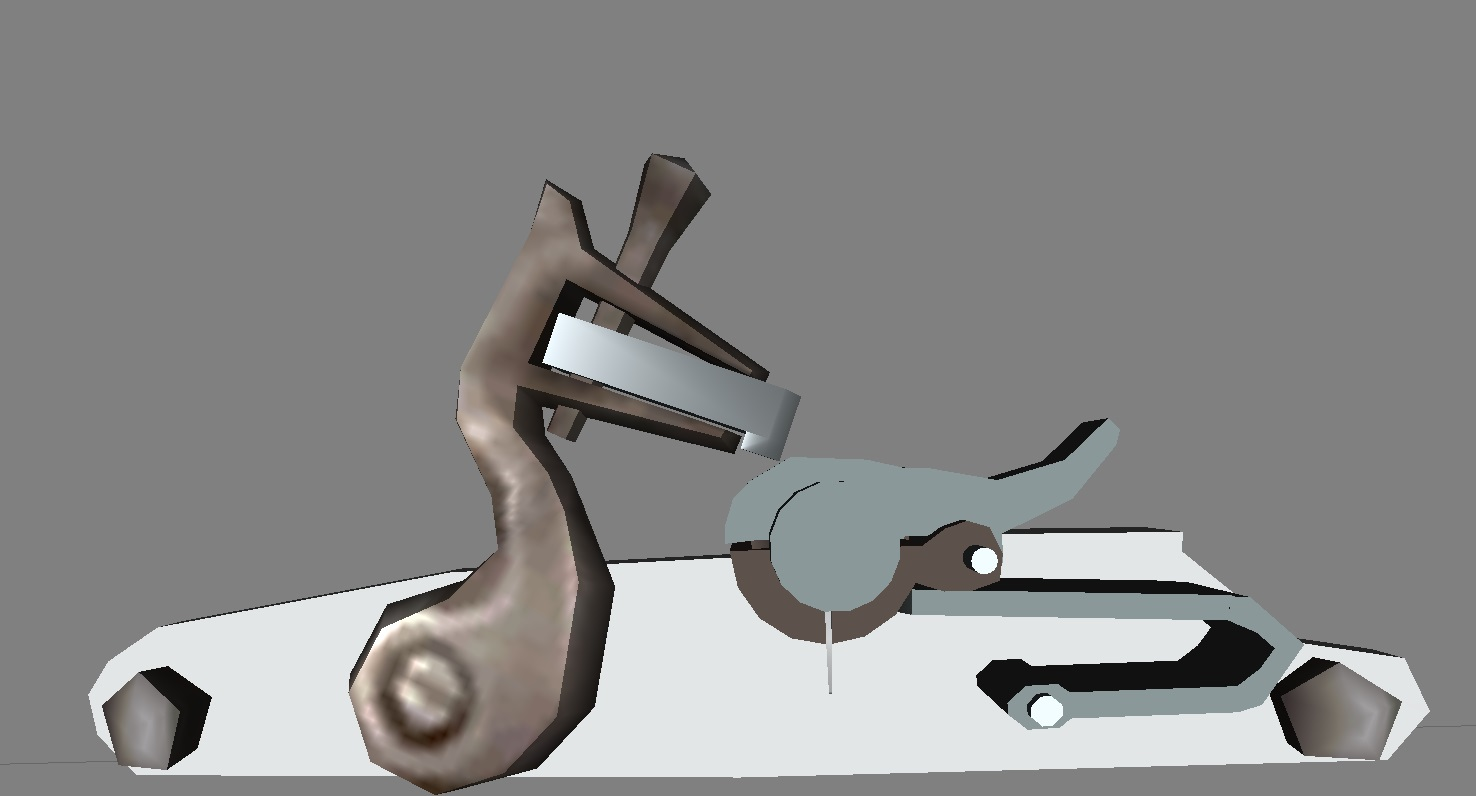
Console musket tube lock, closed. Several thousands of Austrian flintlock carbines and short rifles were converted to this percussion system in 1835-1838.

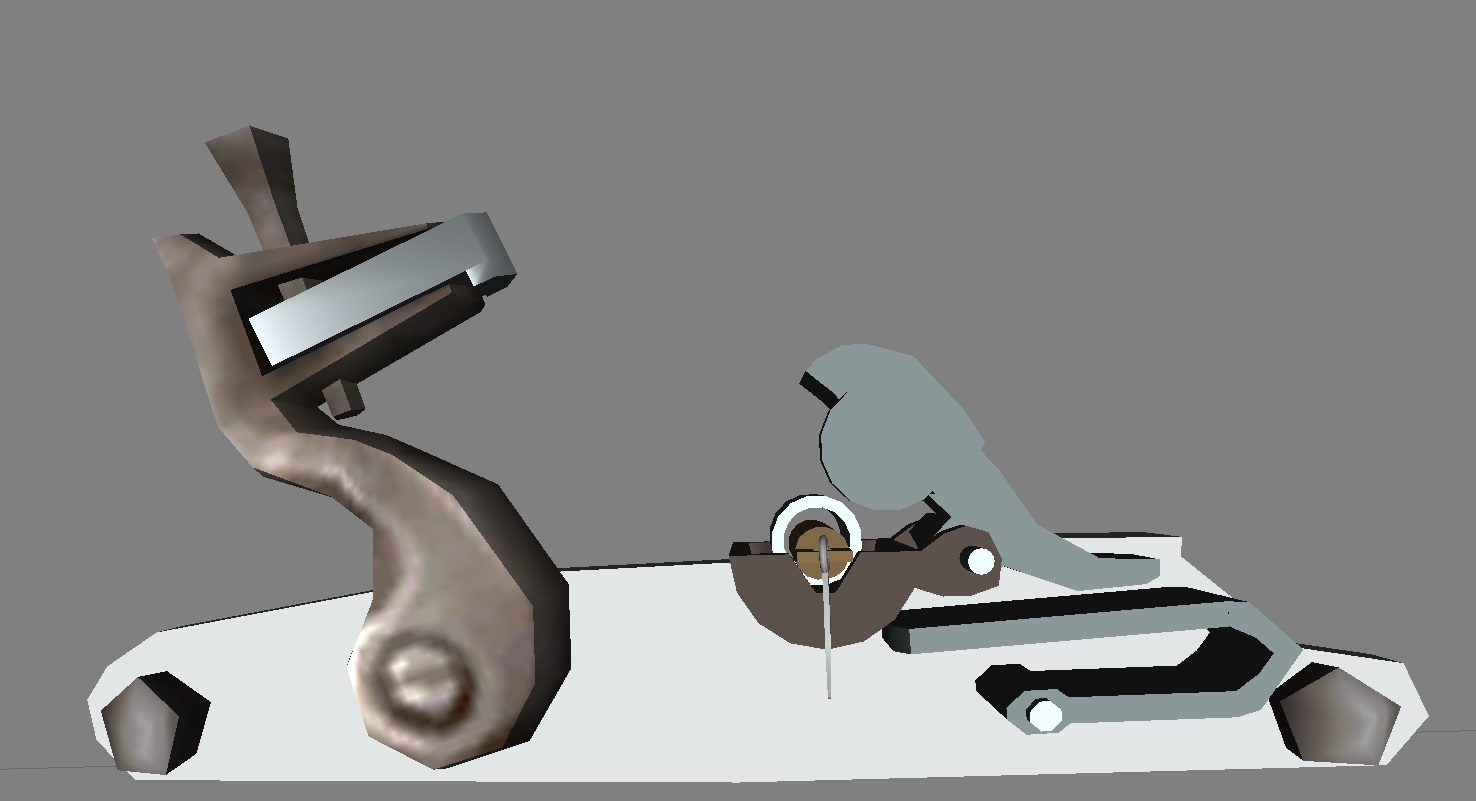
Console musket tube lock, with pan cover (lid) open to show primer tube inside.

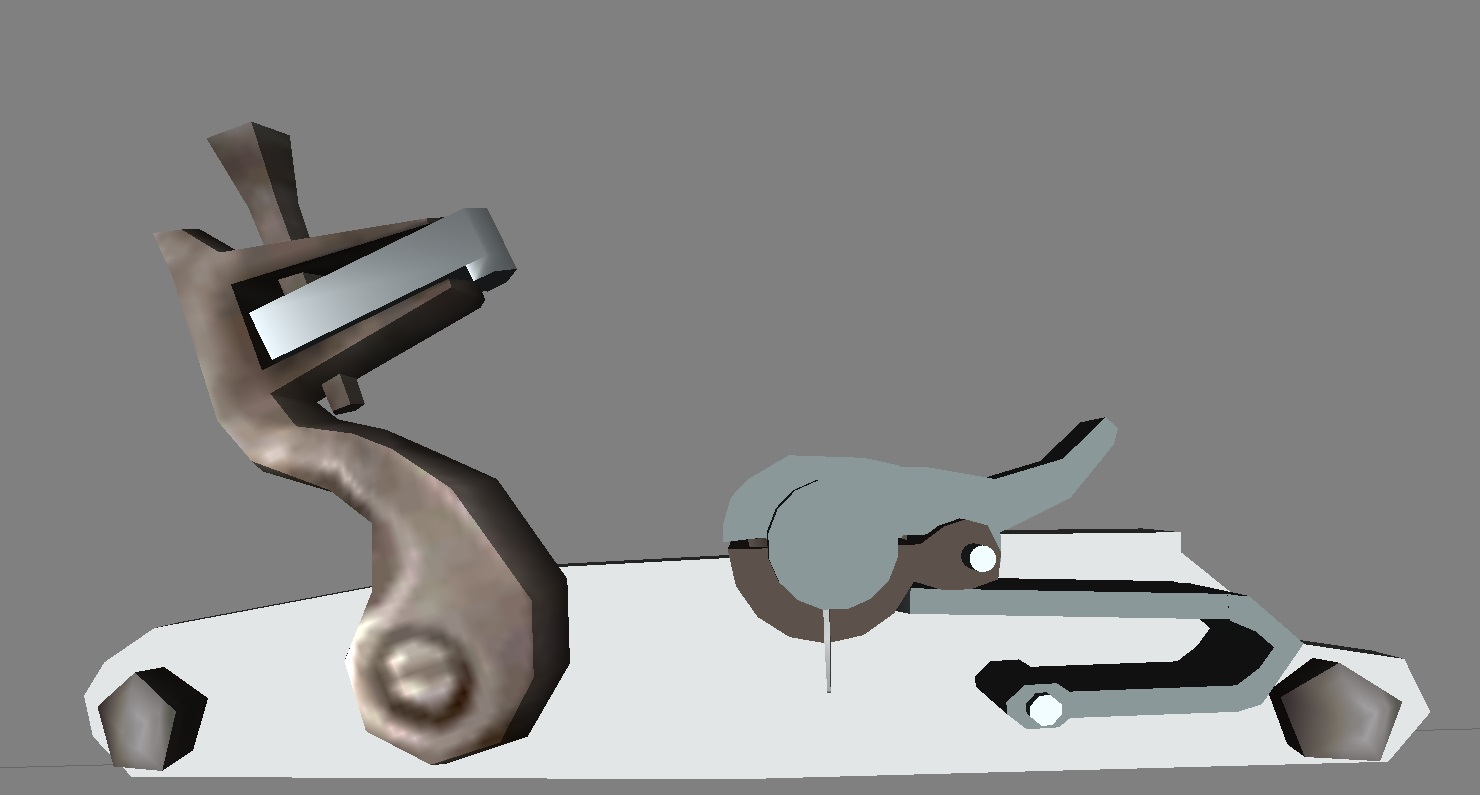
Console musket lock closed and ready to fire.

Console percussion lock was invented in 1830 by the Austrian tax official Giuseppe Console in Milan. Instead of the classical percussion cap, Console attached a piece of straw to a string and filled it with a mixture of potassium chlorate and blackpowder, making that way a primer tube. When subjected to the hammer blow, the primer tube would explode. Replacing straw with a cylinder of rolled copper sheet (10-15 mm long, 2-3 mm in diameter) attached to a wire suitable for gripping (and binding to the paper cartridge), Console developed a primer tube suitable for military use. He also developed a simple percussion lock, ideal for quick and cheap conversion of the large stock of the existing Austrian military flintlock weapons.

Console percussion lock retained most of the old flintlock parts: it needed only a new priming pan (iron groove with a short tube at the left side, next to the touch-hole) and a spring-loaded pan cover, with a protrusion (tooth) on the lower side. The old flintlock hammer could also be used, by clamping a piece of iron between its yaws instead of the flint.

The groove corresponded to the firing hole, and the sausage-shaped "igniter" (priming tube) was inserted into it and held in place by the pan cover. The blow of the hammer—the old cock remained, but with a piece of iron screwed in instead of the flint—on the lid caused the explosion.

Testing in 1835 showed that Console muskets were superior to flintlocks both in the rate of fire (12 to 5 shots respectively) and reliability. The rate of misfire for Console muskets was about 10%, compared to 20-30% for flintlock weapons. However, it was much worse than the less than 1% for the standard caplock weapons of the day.

In 1835-1838 several thousands of flintlock carbines and rifles were converted to the Console tube lock.

=== Augustin percussion lock ===
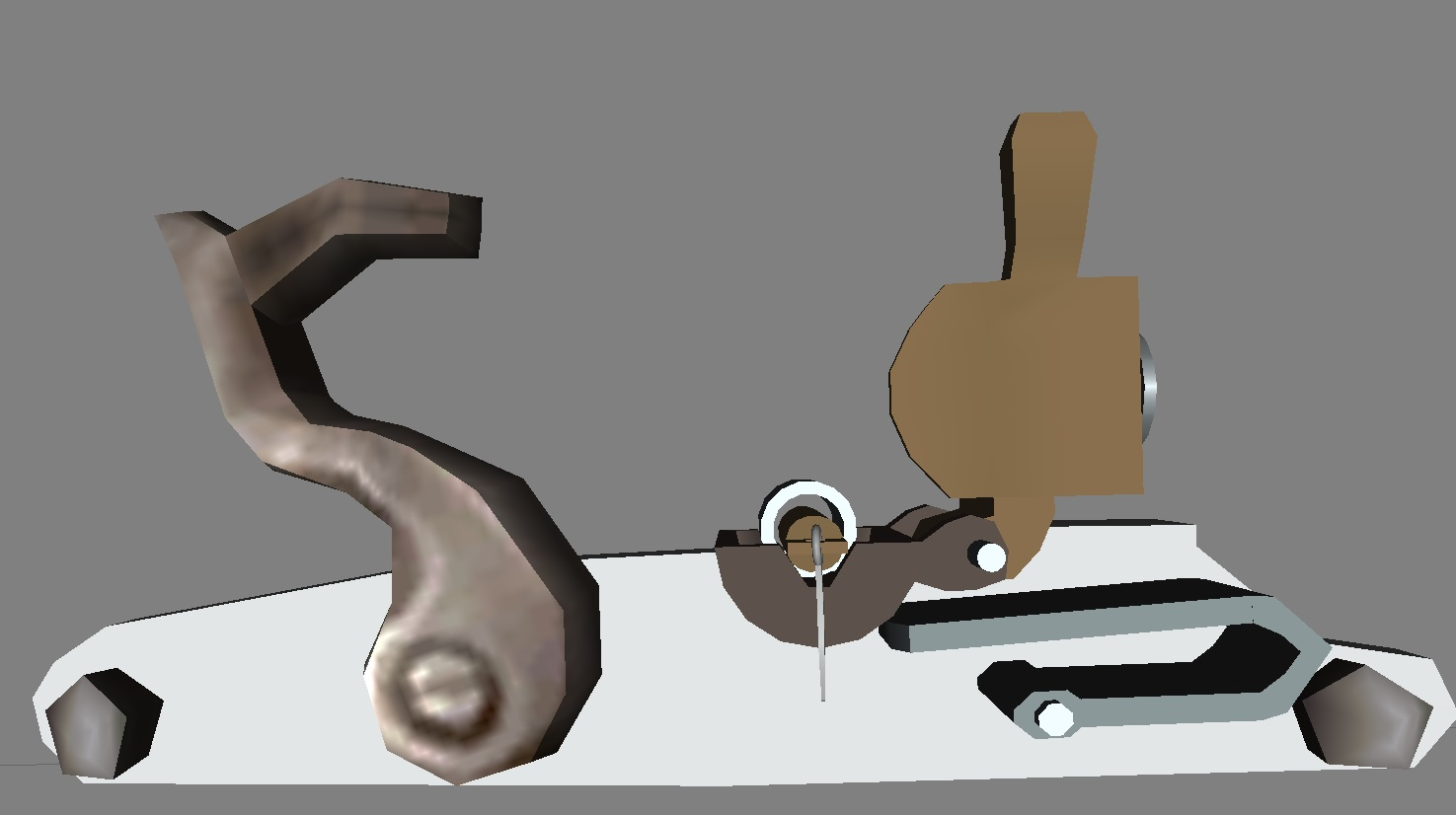
Augustin musket tube lock, open to show the primer tube.

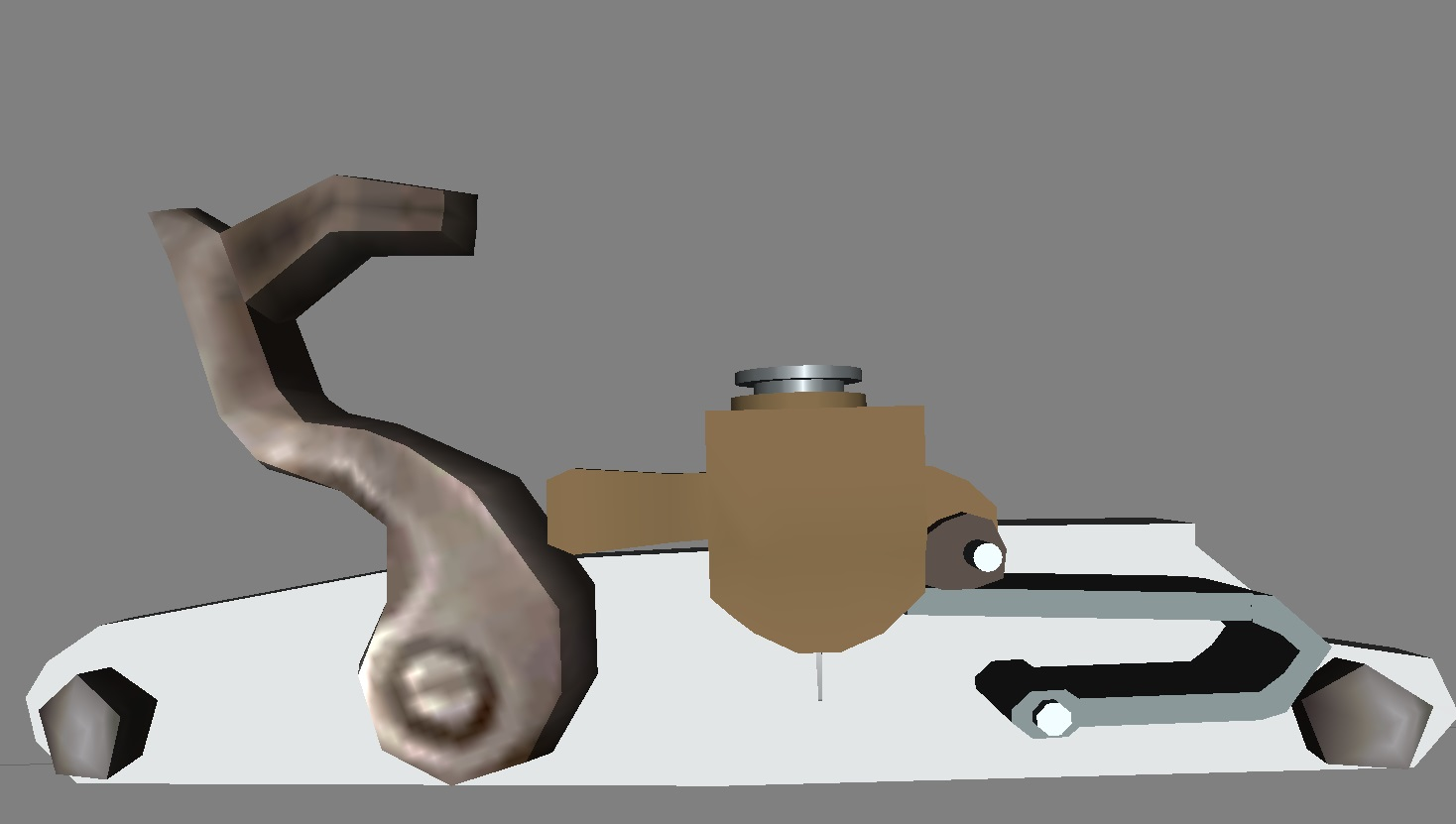
Augustin musket tube lock, closed and ready to fire.

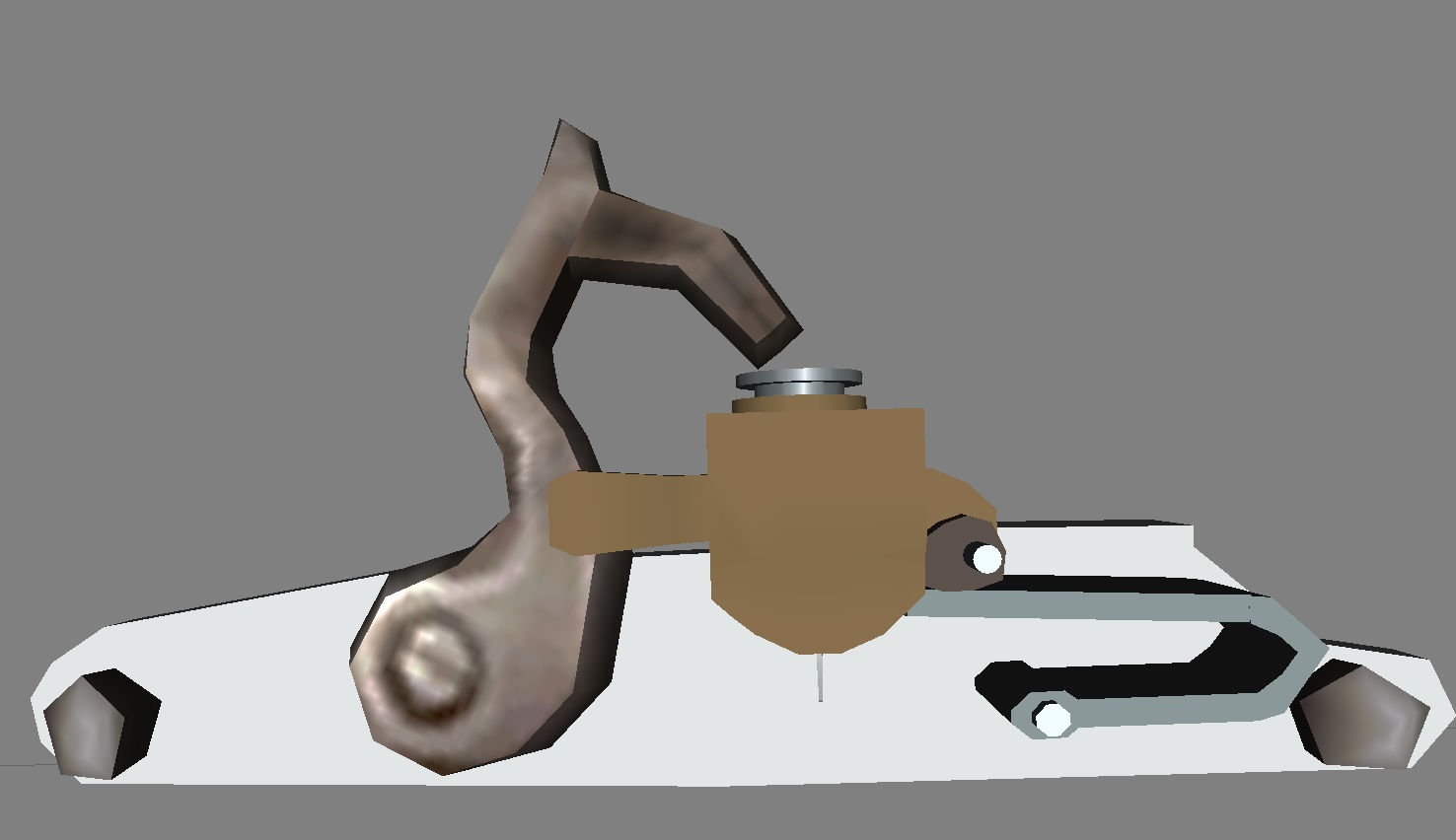
Augustin musket tube lock. More than 600,000 of percussion rifles and carbines of this system were produced or converted from older flintlocks in Austria in 1840-1850.

The fact that the spring-loaded lid often activated the easily detonated primer tube when closed prompted Baron Augustin, who in 1840. became the head of the State Arsenal in Vienna, to incorporate a firing pin ('tooth') into the lid that could be easily moved up and down. Thus, with a minor design change, the Augustin tube lock was created. Overshadowing Console's invention, it was initially introduced in 1840 as the "large Augustin tube lock" and produced by reconstructing the old locks. However, as early as 1842, it was delivered as a "small Augustin lock or machine lock" by the Brevillier company in Vienna, using a new process for hardened casting. The firing pin in the pan lid underwent design changes in 1845 and 1846. All firearms in Austria from 1798 onwards received new locks. More than 80,000 of flintlock muskets and rifles were converted to the Augustin tube lock, and more than 600,000 new weapons were produced in 1840-1853.

== Literature ==
- Németh, Balázs (2020). Early Military Rifles 1740–1850. London: Bloomsbury Publishing. pp. 25–29. ISBN 978-1-472-84229-9.
- Bogdanović, Branko; Valenčak, Ivan (1990). Puške: dva veka pušaka na teritoriji Jugoslavije [Rifles: two centuries of rifles in the territory of Yugoslavia] (in Serbian) (1. ed.). Beograd: DP Sportinvest [u.a.] pp. 45–47. ISBN 978-86-7597-001-9.
- Dolleczek, Anton (1896). Monographie der k. und k. osterr.-ung. blanken und Handfeuer-Waffen [Monograph of the Imperial and Royal Austrian-Hungarian edged weapons and firearms] (PDF) (in German). Wien: Kreisel & Gröger. pp. 90–93, 119–120, 205.
- Teuber, Oscar; von Ottenfeld, Rudolf (1895). Die österreichische Armee von 1700 bis 1867 [The Austrian Army from 1700 to 1867] (PDF) (in German). Wien: Emil Berté & Cie und S. Czeiger. pp. 843–853.
- Morin, Marco (1981). Le Armi Portatili Dell'impero Austro Ungarico (in Italian). FIRENZE: EDITORIALE OLIMPIA. pp. 25–30.
