= Percussion cap =

Ignition source in a type of firearm mechanism

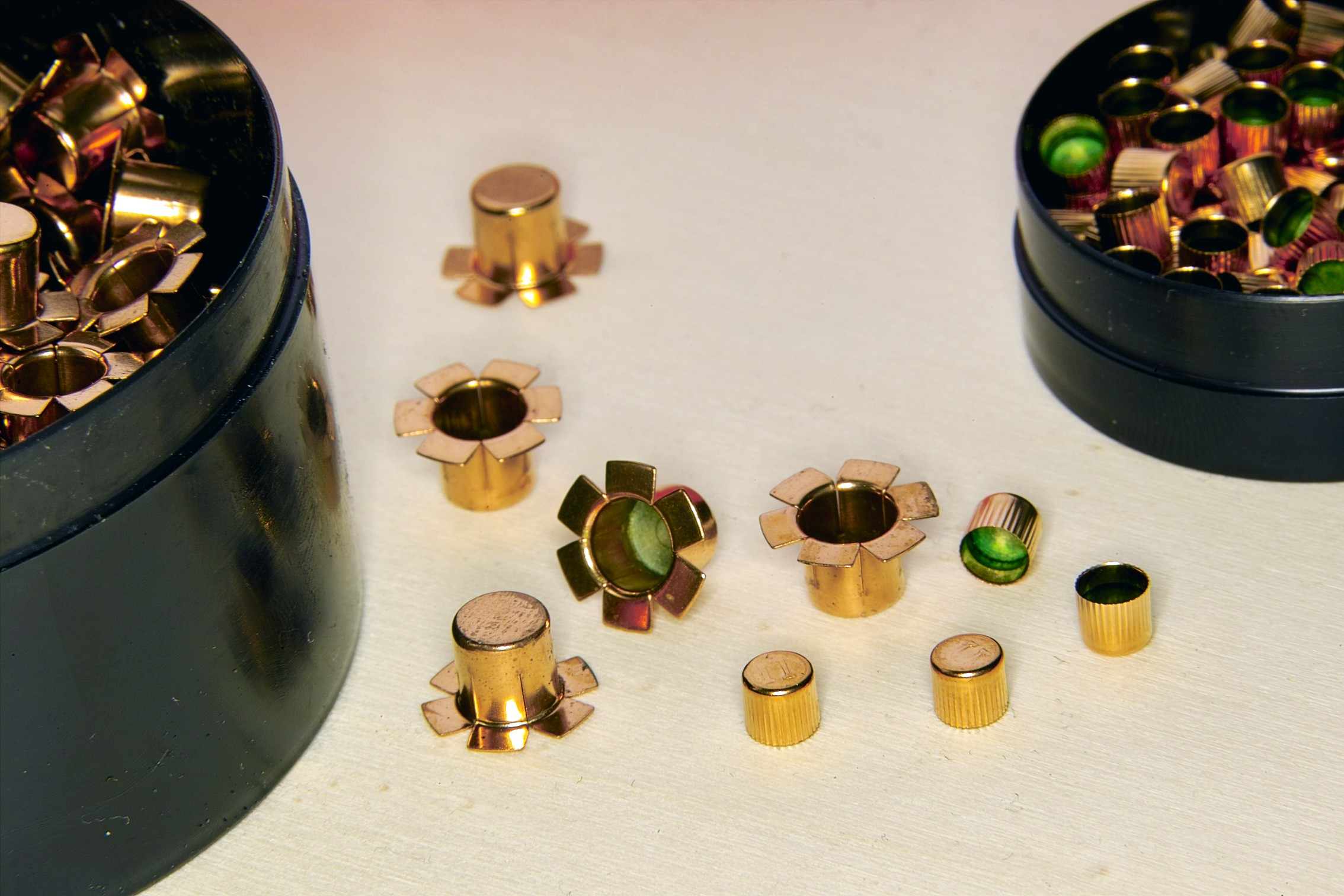
Percussion caps have been manufactured in various sizes to fit snugly over different sized nipples.

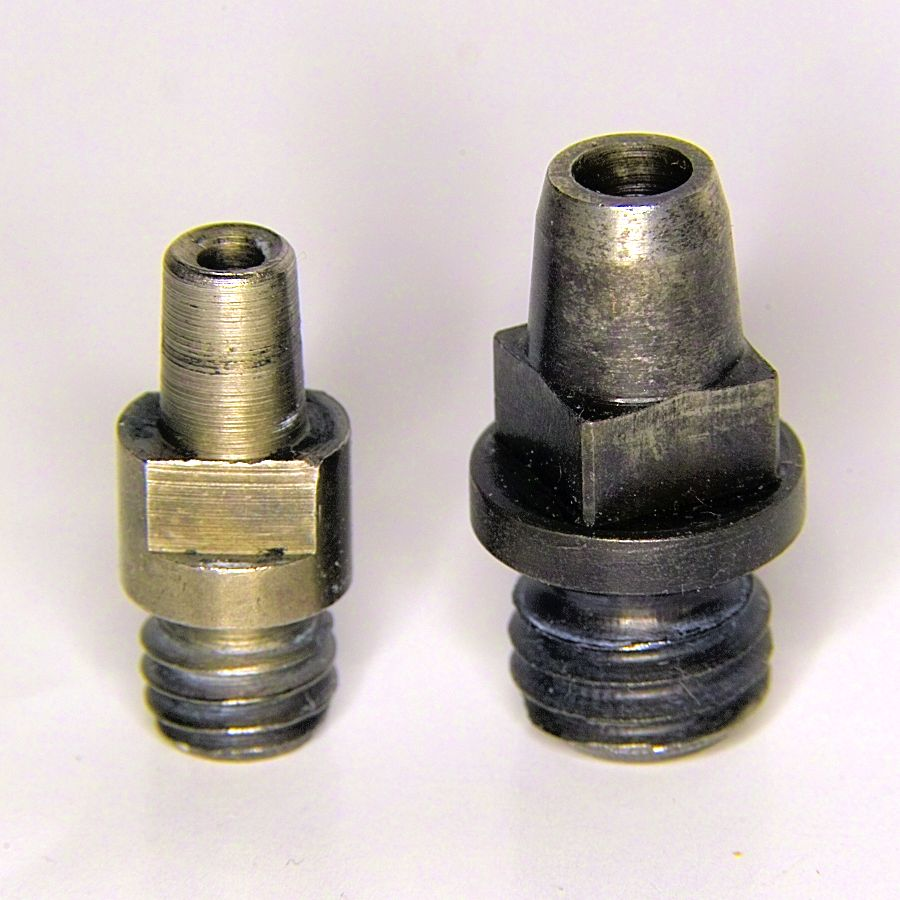
Nipples for 4.5mm and 6mm percussion caps

The percussion cap, percussion primer, or caplock, introduced in the early 1820s, is a type of single-use percussion ignition device for muzzle loader firearm locks enabling them to fire reliably in any weather condition. Its invention gave rise to the caplock mechanism or percussion lock system which used percussion caps struck by the hammer to set off the gunpowder charge in rifles and cap and ball firearms. Any firearm using a caplock mechanism is a percussion gun. Any long gun with a cap-lock mechanism and rifled barrel is a percussion rifle. Cap and ball describes cap-lock firearms discharging a single bore-diameter spherical bullet with each shot.

== Description ==
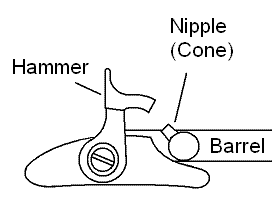
All caplock mechanisms rely upon a hammer impact.

The percussion cap is a small cylinder of copper or brass with one closed end. Inside the closed end is a small amount of a shock-sensitive explosive material such as mercury fulminate (discovered in 1800; it was the only practical detonator used from about the mid-19th century to the early 20th century).

The caplock mechanism consists of a hammer and a nipple (sometimes referred to as a cone). The nipple contains a hollow conduit which goes into the rearmost part of the gun barrel, and the percussion cap is placed over the nipple hole. Pulling the trigger releases the hammer, which strikes the percussion cap against the nipple (which serves as an anvil), crushing it and detonating the mercury fulminate inside, which releases sparks that travel through the hollow nipple into the barrel and ignite the main powder charge.

Percussion caps have been made in small sizes for pistols and larger sizes for rifles and muskets.

== Origins ==
Earlier firearms used flintlock mechanisms causing a piece of flint to strike a steel frizzen producing sparks to ignite a pan of priming powder and thereby fire the gun's main powder charge. The flintlock mechanism replaced older ignition systems such as the matchlock and wheellock, but all were prone to misfire in wet weather.

The discovery of fulminates was made by Edward Charles Howard (1774–1816) in 1800. The invention that made the percussion cap possible using the recently discovered fulminates was patented by the Reverend Alexander John Forsyth of Belhelvie, Aberdeenshire, Scotland, in 1807. The rudimentary percussion system was invented by Forsyth as a solution to the problem that birds would startle when smoke puffed from the powder pan of his flintlock shotgun, giving them sufficient warning to escape the shot. This early percussion lock system operated in a nearly identical fashion to flintlock firearms and used a fulminating primer made of fulminate of mercury, chlorate of potash, sulphur and charcoal, ignited by concussion. His invention of a fulminate-primed firing mechanism deprived the birds of their early warning system, both by avoiding the initial puff of smoke from the flintlock powder pan, as well as shortening the interval between the trigger pull and the shot leaving the muzzle. Forsyth patented his "scent bottle" ignition system in 1807. It was not until after Forsyth's patents expired that the conventional percussion cap system was developed. Joseph Manton invented a precursor to the percussion cap in 1814, comprising a copper tube that detonated when crushed. This was further developed in 1822 by the English-born American artist Joshua Shaw as a copper cup filled with fulminates.

The first purpose-built caplock guns were fowling pieces commissioned by sportsmen in Regency era England. Due to the mechanism's compactness and superior reliability compared to the flintlock, gunsmiths were able to manufacture pistols and long guns with two barrels. Early caplock handguns with two or more barrels and a single lock are known as turn-over or twister pistols, due to the need to manually rotate the second barrel to align with the hammer. With the addition of a third barrel, and a ratchet to mechanically turn the barrels while cocking the hammer, these caplock pistols evolved into the pepper-box revolver during the 1830s.

The caplock offered many improvements over the flintlock. The caplock was easier and quicker to load, more resilient to weather conditions, and far more reliable than the flintlock. Many of the older flintlock weapons were later converted to the caplock, so that they could take advantage of these features.

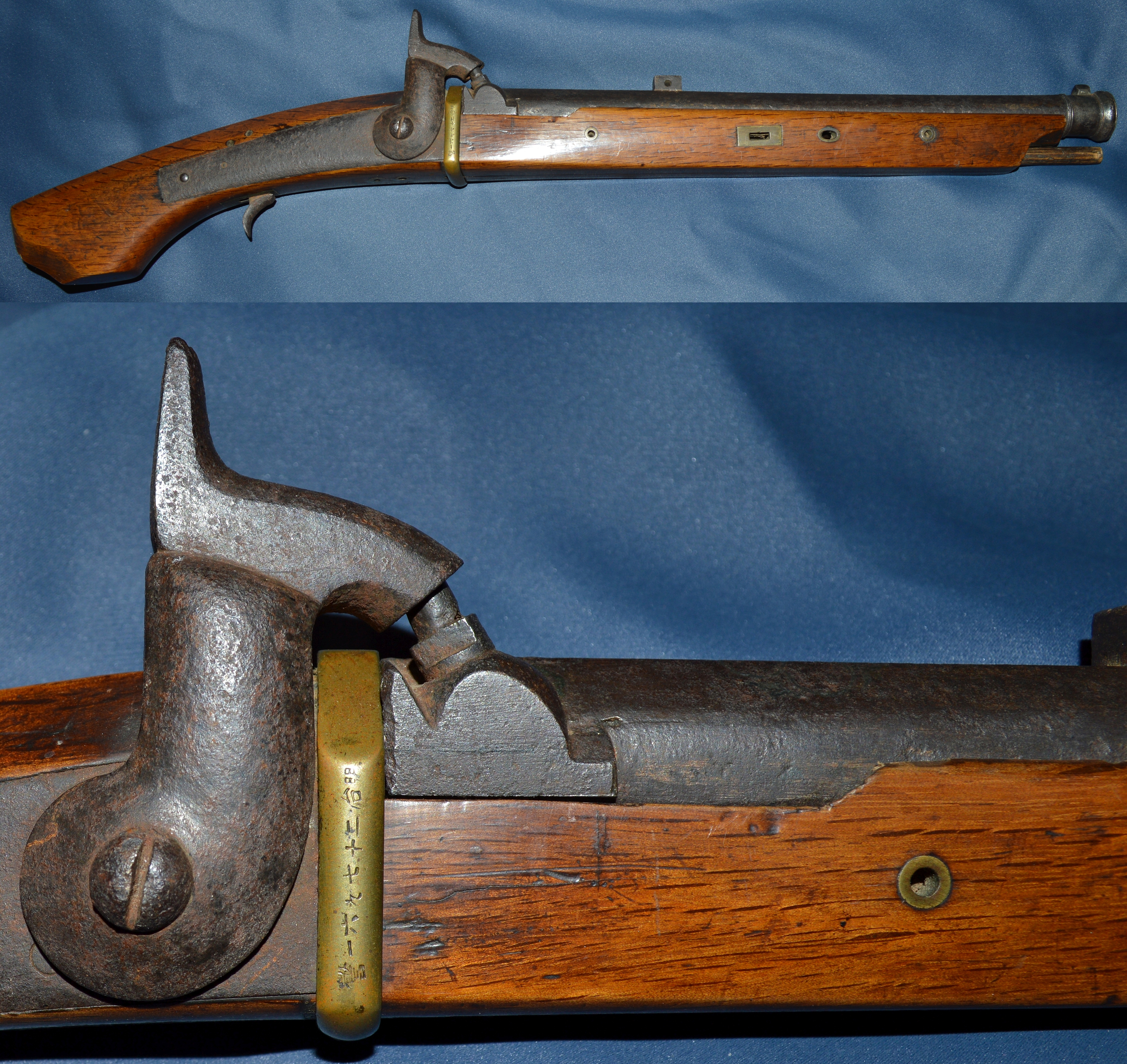
Japanese matchlock converted to caplock, the brass band is dated to Meiji 27 (明治二十七), i.e. 1894

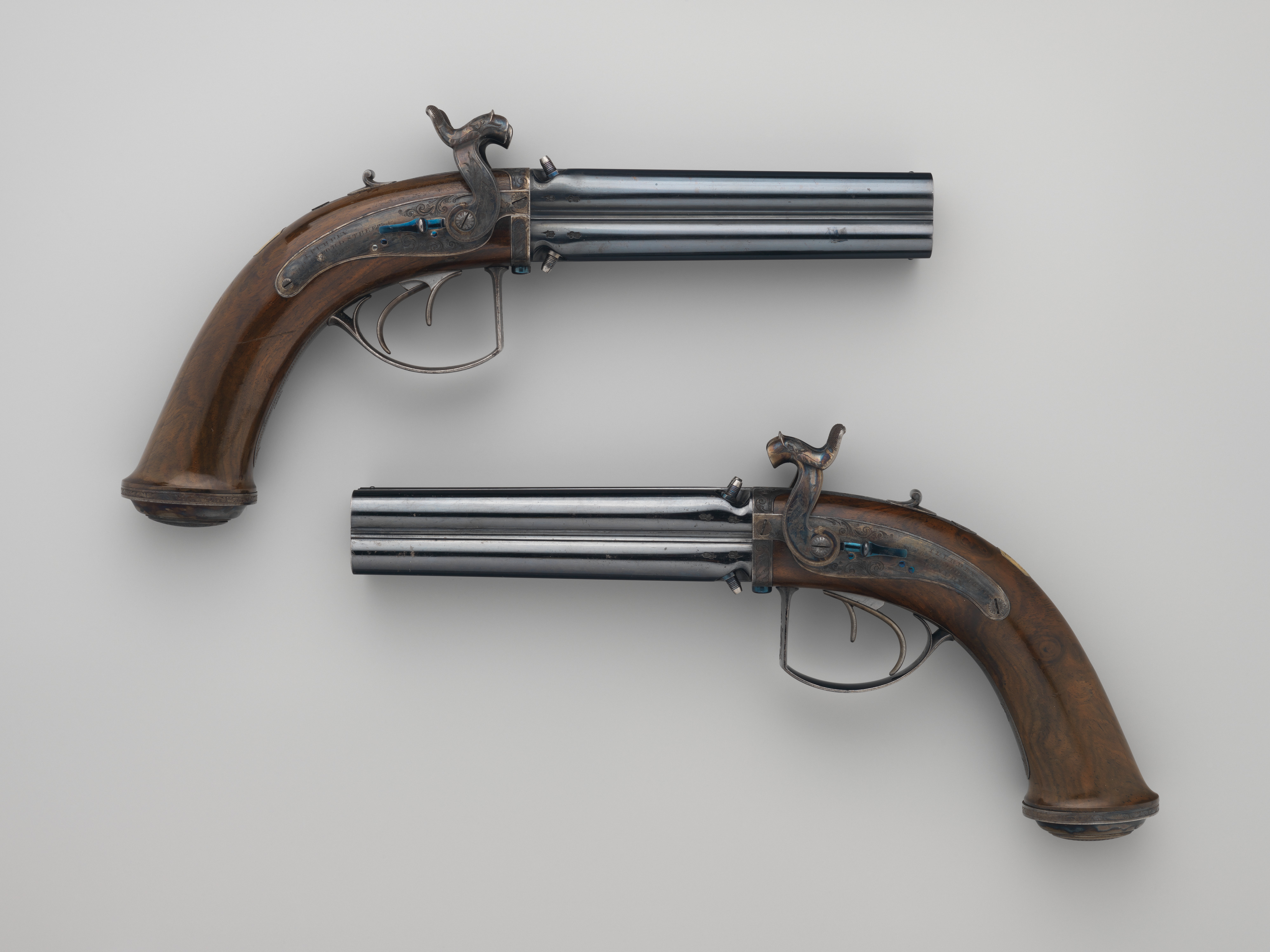
A pair of caplock twister pistols

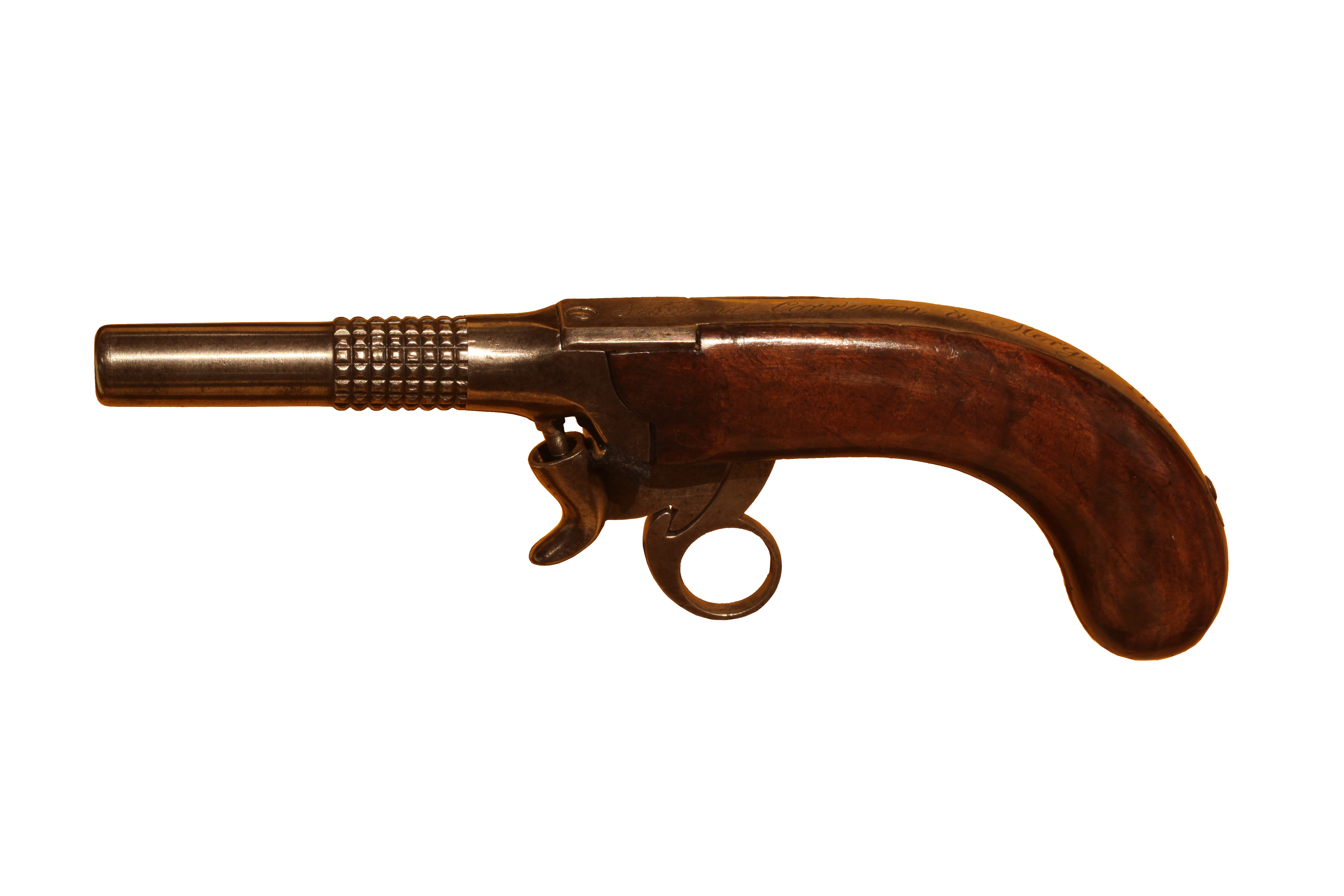
Inverted percussion pistol, 9.5 mm; made by gunsmith Correvon, Morges, 1854

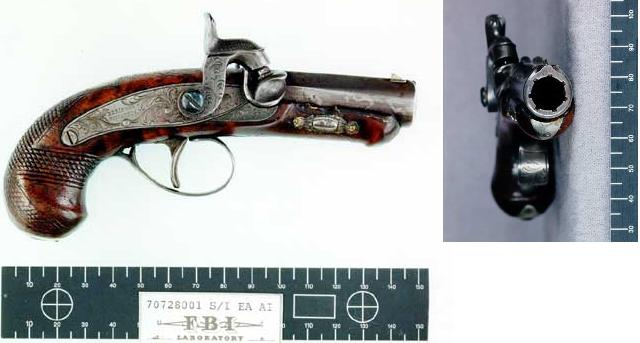
John Wilkes Booth's single-shot caplock derringer used to assassinate Abraham Lincoln

== Parallel developments ==
Joshua Shaw is sometimes credited (primarily by himself) with the development of the first metallic percussion cap in 1814, a reusable one made of iron, then a disposable pewter one in 1815 and finally a copper one in 1816. There is no independent proof of this since Shaw was advised he could not patent it due to Alexander Forsyth's patent for using fulminates to ignite guns being in force between 1807 and 1821. Shaw says he only shared the development of his innovation with a few associates (gunmakers and others) who were sworn to secrecy and never provided affidavits at a later date. Shaw's claim to have been the inventor remains clouded in controversy as he did not patent the idea until 1822, having moved to America in 1817. According to Lewis Winant, the US government's decision to award Shaw $25,000 as compensation for his invention being used by the Army was a mistake. Congress believed Shaw's patent was the earliest in the world and awarded him a large sum of money based on this belief. The investigators had overlooked two French patents and the earlier use of the idea in Britain.

The earliest known patent anywhere in the world which specifically mentions a percussion cap and nipple was granted in France on 29 July 1818 to François Prélat, four years before Shaw's patent. Prelat made a habit of copying English patents and inventions and the mode of operation he describes is flawed. Secondly, a French patent of a percussion cap and nipple had been granted in 1820 to Deboubert. Predating both of these French claims is an 1817 attribution to Joseph Egg, the most likely inventor according to historian Sidney James Gooding.

There were other earlier claims. Col. Peter Hawker in 1830 simultaneously claimed and denied being the inventor. "I do not wish to say I was the inventor of it - very probably not" but then immediately recounts that he came up with the idea of simplifying a Manton patch-lock, which could be troublesome, by designing a cap and nipple arrangement around 1816 when the patch lock was patented. He says he then presented a drawing to a reluctant Joseph Manton to make a few copper cap guns which were then sold. Hawker, seems to give Joseph Manton more of the glory eight years later in the 1838 edition of his 'Instructions to young Sportsmen', by stating categorically that "copper tubes and primers were decidedly invented by Joe Manton". By the 1850s Hawker was again claiming the invention for himself in his press advertisements.

Despite many years of research by Winant, Gooding and De Witt Bailey, the jury is still out as the competing claims are based on personal accounts and have little or no independently verifiable evidence.

While the metal percussion cap was the most popular and widely used type of primer, their small size made them difficult to handle under the stress of combat or while riding a horse. Accordingly, several manufacturers developed alternative, "auto-priming" systems. The "Maynard tape primer", for example, used a roll of paper "caps" much like today's toy cap gun. The Maynard tape primer was fitted to some firearms used in the mid-nineteenth century and a few saw brief use in the American Civil War. Other disc or pellet-type primers held a supply of tiny fulminate detonator discs in a small magazine. Cocking the hammer automatically advanced a disc into position. However, these automatic feed systems were difficult to make with the manufacturing systems in the early and mid-nineteenth century and generated more problems than they solved. They were quickly shelved in favor of a single percussion cap that, while unwieldy in some conditions, could be carried in sufficient quantities to make up for occasionally dropping one, while a jammed tape primer system would instead reduce the rifle to an awkward club.

== Military firearms ==
This invention was gradually improved, and came to be used, first in a steel cap and then in a copper cap, by various gunmakers and private individuals before coming into general military use nearly thirty years later. The alteration of the military flintlock to the percussion musket was easily accomplished by replacing the powder pan and steel frizzen with a nipple and by replacing the cock or hammer that held the flint by a smaller hammer formed with a hollow made to fit around the nipple when released by the trigger. On the nipple was placed the copper cap containing Shaw's detonating composition of three parts of chlorate of potash, two of fulminate of mercury and one of powdered glass. The hollow in the hammer contained the fragments of the cap if it fragmented, reducing the risk of injury to the firer's eyes. From the 1820s onwards, the armies of Britain, France, Russia, and America began converting their muskets to the new percussion system. Caplocks were generally applied to the British military musket (the Brown Bess) in 1842, a quarter of a century after the invention of percussion powder and after an elaborate government test at Woolwich in 1834. The first percussion firearm produced for the US military was the percussion carbine version (c.1833) of the M1819 Hall rifle. The Americans' breech loading caplock Hall rifles, muzzle loading rifled muskets and Colt Dragoon revolvers gave them an advantage over the smoothbore flintlock Brown Bess muskets used by Santa Anna's troops during the Mexican War. In Japan, matchlock pistols and muskets were converted to percussion from the 1850s onwards, and new guns based on existing designs were manufactured as caplocks.

The Austrians instead used a variant of Manton's tube lock in their Augustin musket until the conventional caplock Lorenz rifle was introduced in 1855. The first practical solution for the problem of handling percussion caps in battle was the Prussian 1841 (Dreyse needle gun), which used a long needle to penetrate a paper cartridge filled with black powder and strike the percussion cap that was fastened to the base of the bullet. While it had a number of problems, it was widely used by the Prussians and other German states in the mid-nineteenth century and was a major factor in the 1866 Austro-Prussian War. The needle gun originally fired paper cartridges containing a bullet, powder charge and percussion cap, but by the time of the Franco-Prussian War this had evolved into modern brass ammunition.

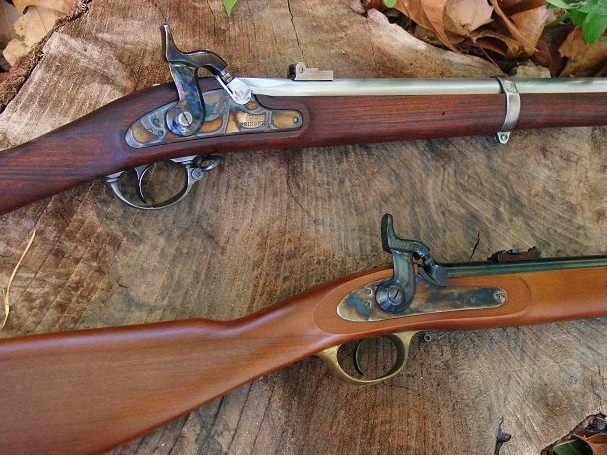
Reproduction Springfield and Enfield caplocks

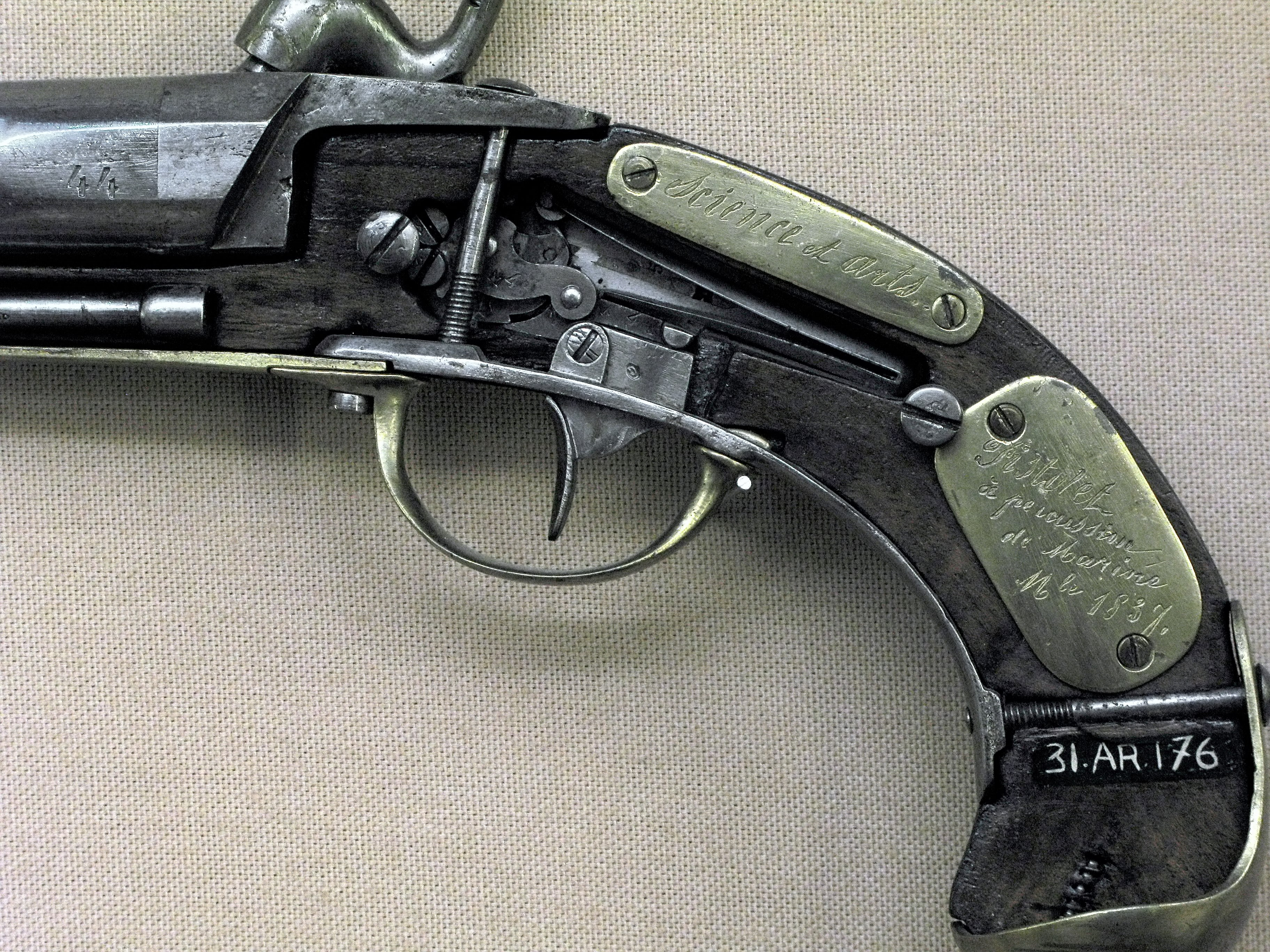
Detail of the firing mechanism on an instruction cutaway model of a French navy percussion pistol, model 1837

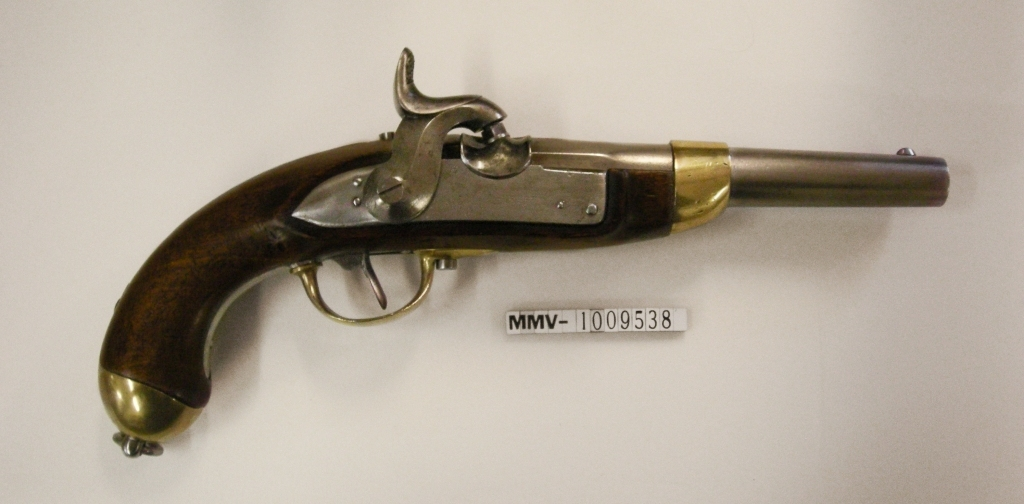
Caplock horse pistol, Swiss Ordnance 1817/42

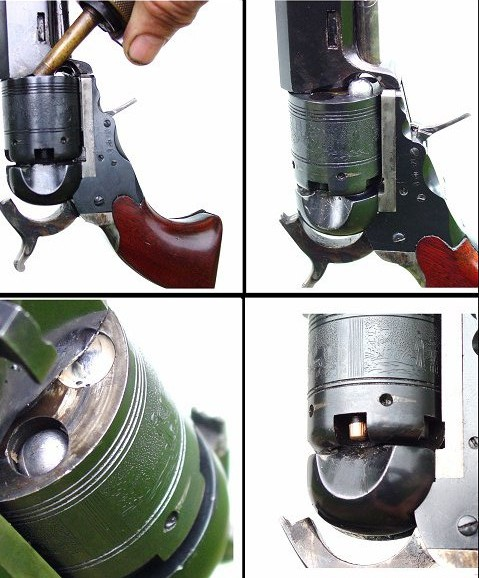
Loading sequence for percussion revolvers

== Later firearms evolution ==
The percussion cap brought about the invention of the modern cartridge case and made possible the general adoption of the breech-loading principle for all varieties of rifles, shotguns and pistols. After the American Civil War, Britain, France, and America began converting existing caplock guns to accept brass rimfire and centrefire cartridges. For muskets such as the 1853 Enfield and 1861 Springfield, this involved installing a firing pin in place of the nipple, and a trapdoor in the breech to accept the new bullets. Examples include the Trapdoor Springfield, Tabatière rifle, Westley Richards and Snider–Enfield conversions. The British Army used Snider Enfields contemporaneously with the Martini–Henry rifle until the .303 bolt action Lee–Metford repeating rifle was introduced in the 1880s. Later, military surplus Sniders were purchased as hunting and defensive weapons by British colonists and trusted local natives.

Caplock revolvers such as the Colt Navy and Remington were also widely converted during the late 19th century, by replacing the existing cylinder with one designed for modern ammunition. These were used extensively by the Turks in the Russo-Turkish War, the US Cavalry during the Indian Wars, and also by gunfighters, lawmen, and outlaws in the old west.

In the 1840s and 1850s, the percussion cap was first integrated into a metallic cartridge, where the bullet is held in by the casing, the casing is filled with gunpowder, and a primer is placed on the end. By the 1860s and 1870s, breech-loading metallic cartridges had made the percussion cap system obsolete.

Today, reproduction percussion firearms are popular for recreational shooters and percussion caps are still available (though some modern muzzleloaders use shotshell primers instead of caps). Most percussion caps now use non-corrosive compounds such as lead styphnate.

== Other uses ==
Caps are used in cartridges, grenades, rocket-propelled grenades and rescue flares. Percussion caps are also used in land mine fuzes, booby-trap firing devices and anti-handling devices. Most purpose-made military booby-trap firing devices contain some form of spring-loaded firing pin designed to strike a percussion cap connected to a detonator at one end. The detonator is inserted into an explosive charge—e.g., C-4 or a block of TNT. Triggering the booby-trap (e.g., by pulling on a trip-wire) releases the cocked firing pin that flips forward to strike the percussion cap, firing it and the attached detonator; the shock-wave from the detonator sets off the main explosive charge.

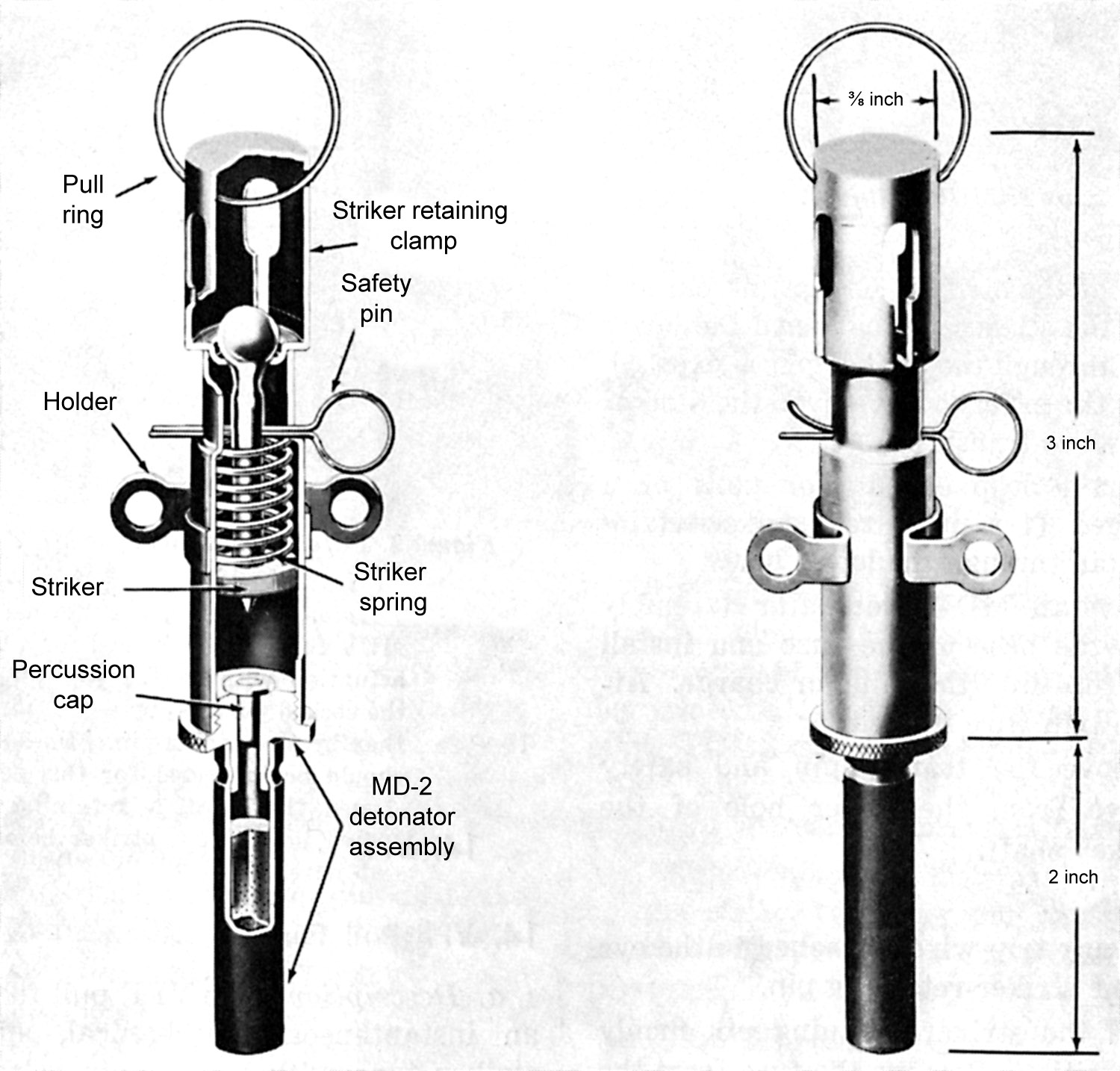
USSR booby trap firing device – pull fuze: normally connected to a tripwire. Percussion cap is clearly labelled.

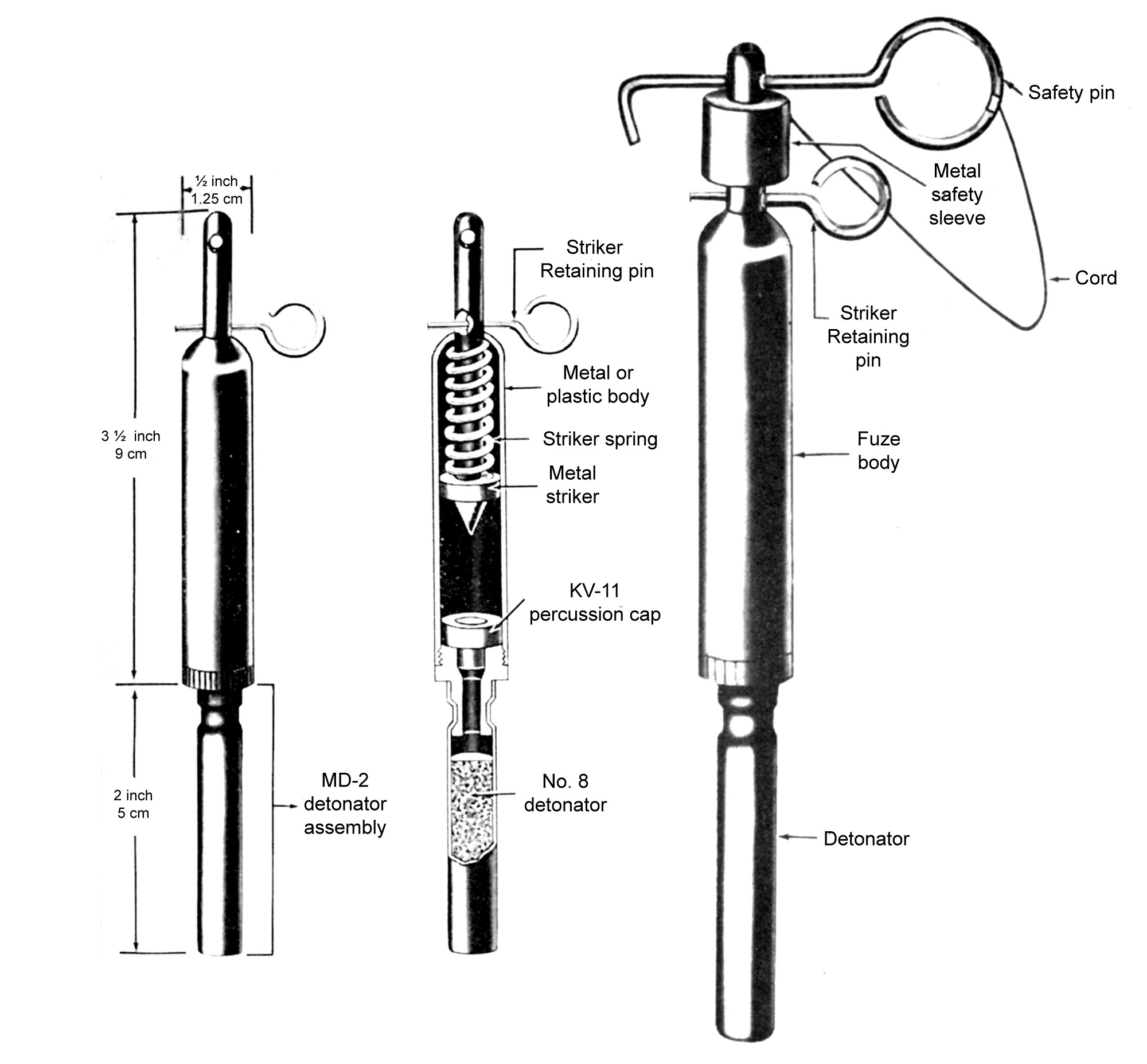
Alternative design of USSR booby trap firing device – pull fuze: normally connected to tripwire. Percussion cap is clearly labelled.

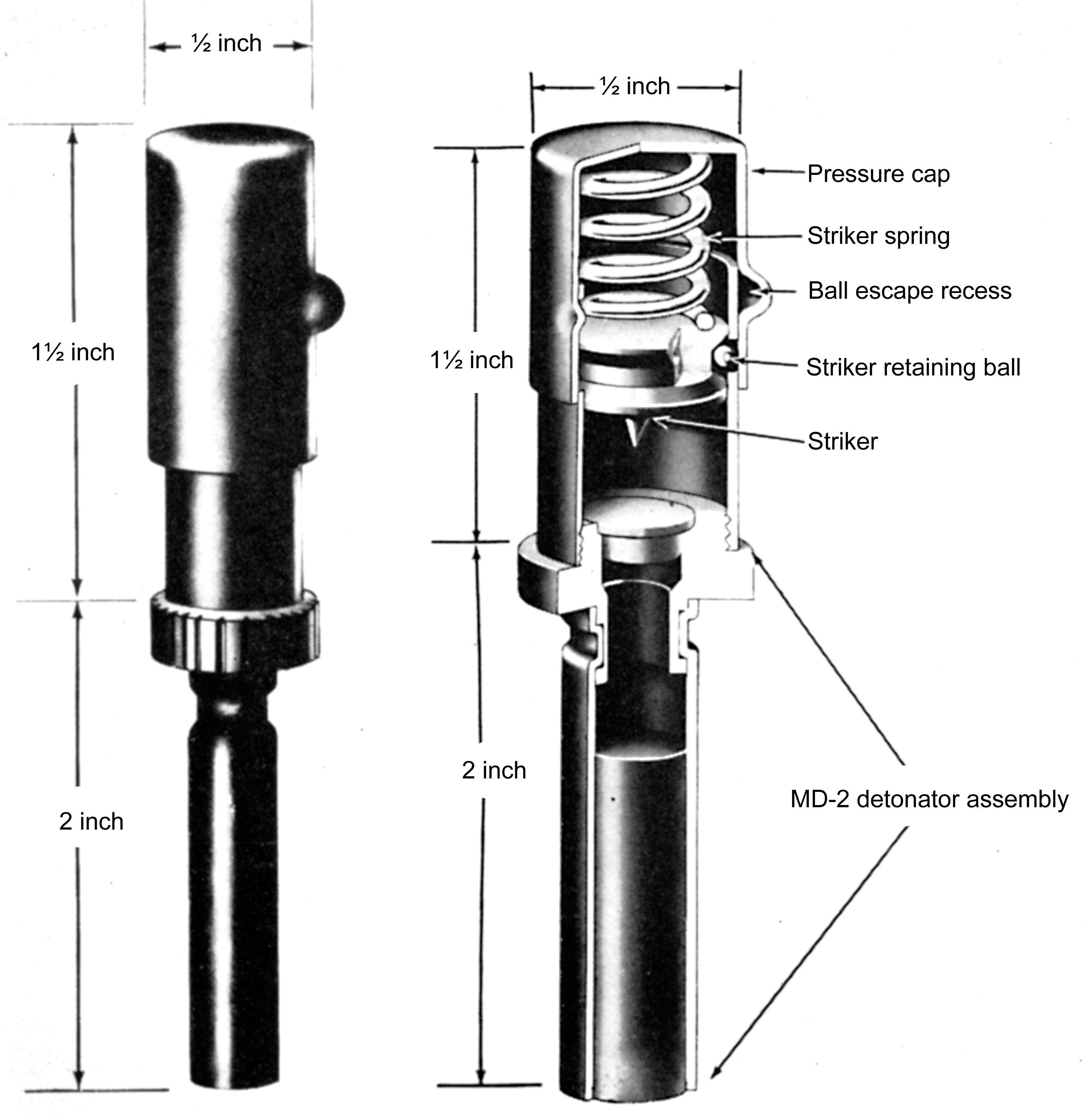
USSR boobytrap firing device – pressure fuze: victim steps on loose floorboard with fuze concealed underneath.

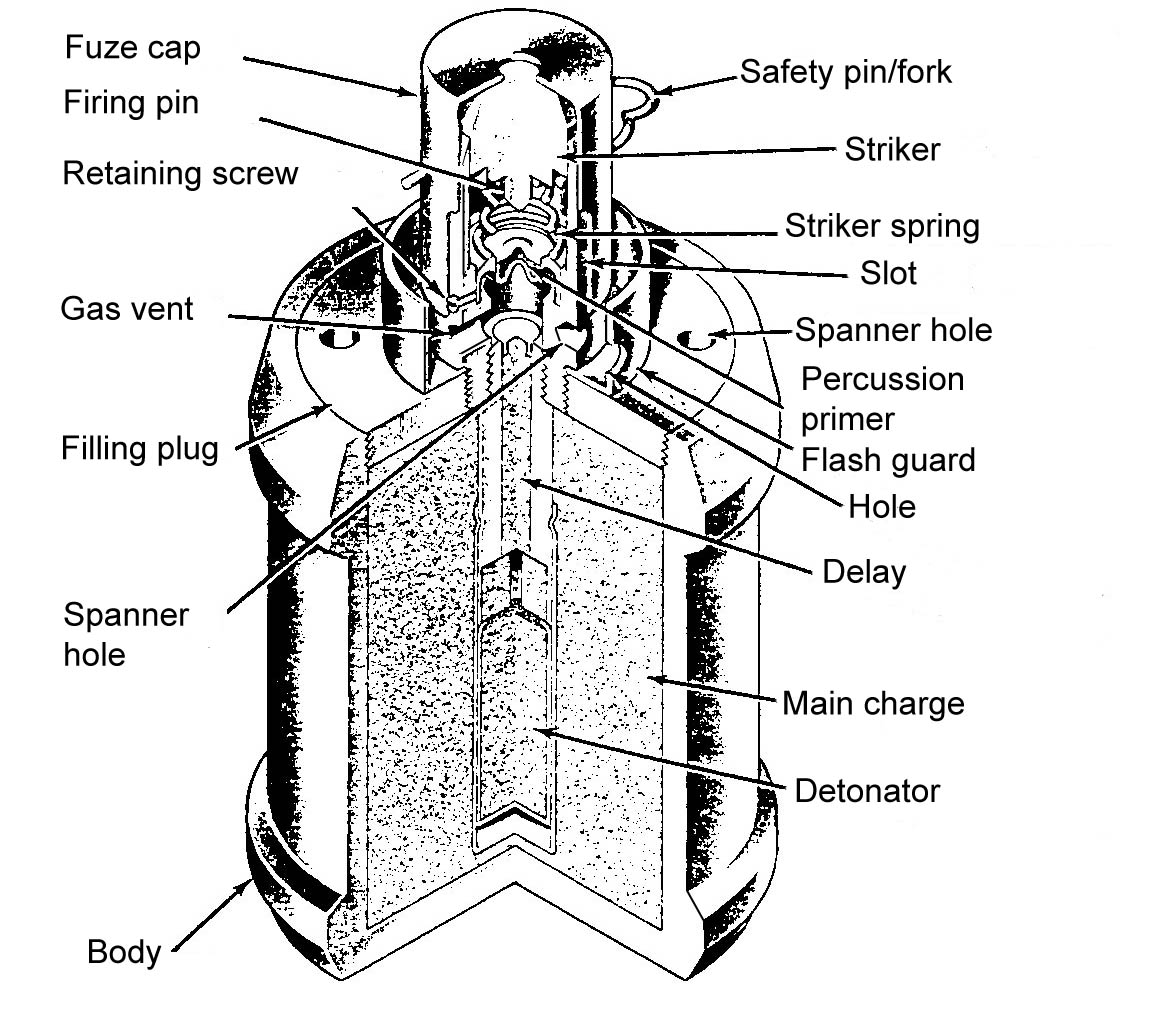
Cross-sectional view of a Japanese Type 99 grenade showing percussion primer

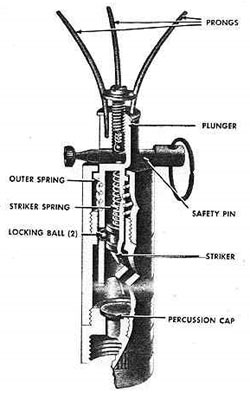
Cross-sectional view of the fuze fitted to a German S-mine. Percussion cap is clearly labelled.

== See also ==
- Arquebus
- Cap gun/Modelguns
- Internal ballistics
- Minié ball
- Nipple wrench
- Primer (firearms)
- Tubes and primers for ammunition

== Bibliography ==
- Winant, L. (1956). Early percussion firearms. Bonanza Books
