= Console percussion musket =

Austrian percussion weapon

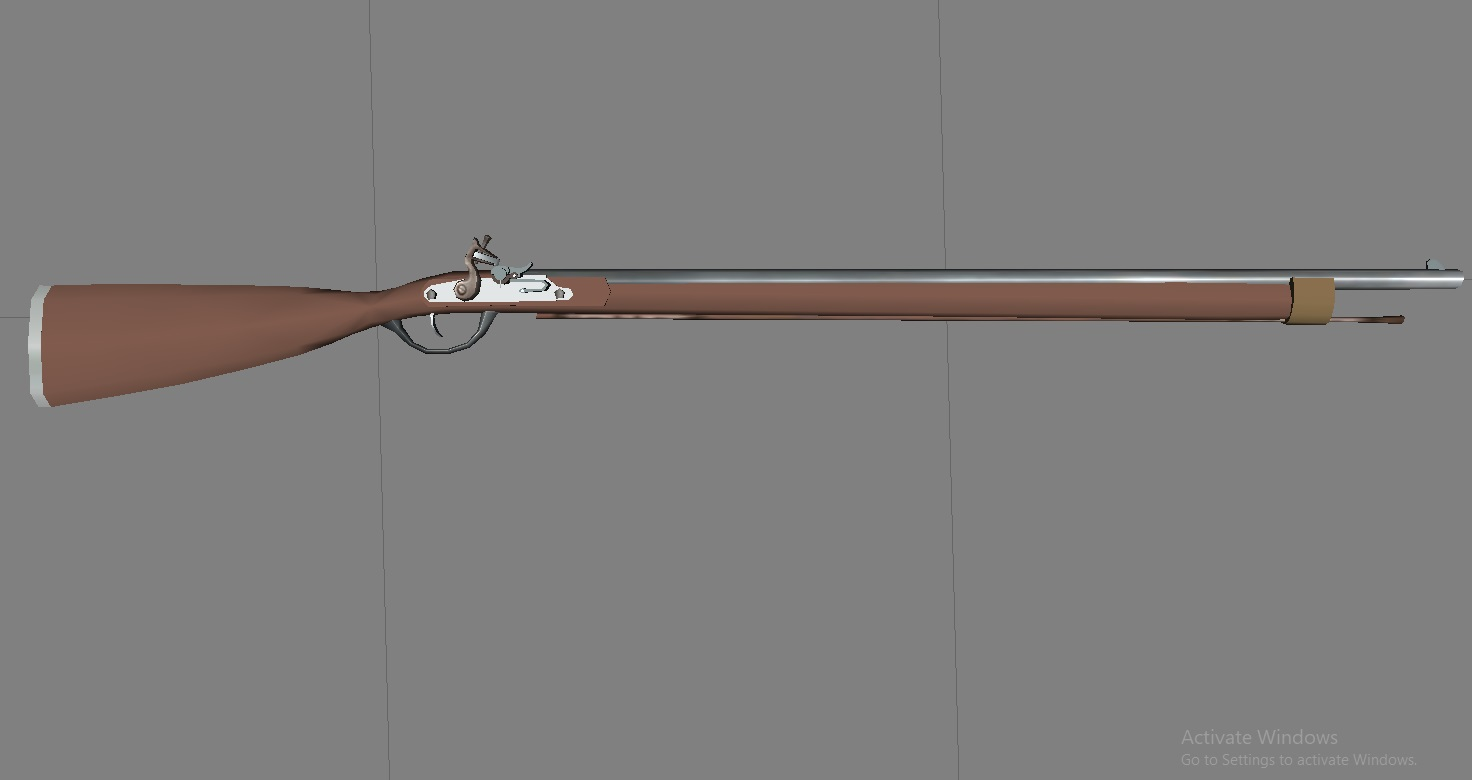
- 3D model of an Austrian Console percussion musket.
- Type: Musket
- Place of origin: Austrian Empire

Service history
- In service: Austrian military service
- Used by: Austrian Empire

Production history
- Designer: Giuseppe Console
- Designed: 1830
- Produced: 1835–1838

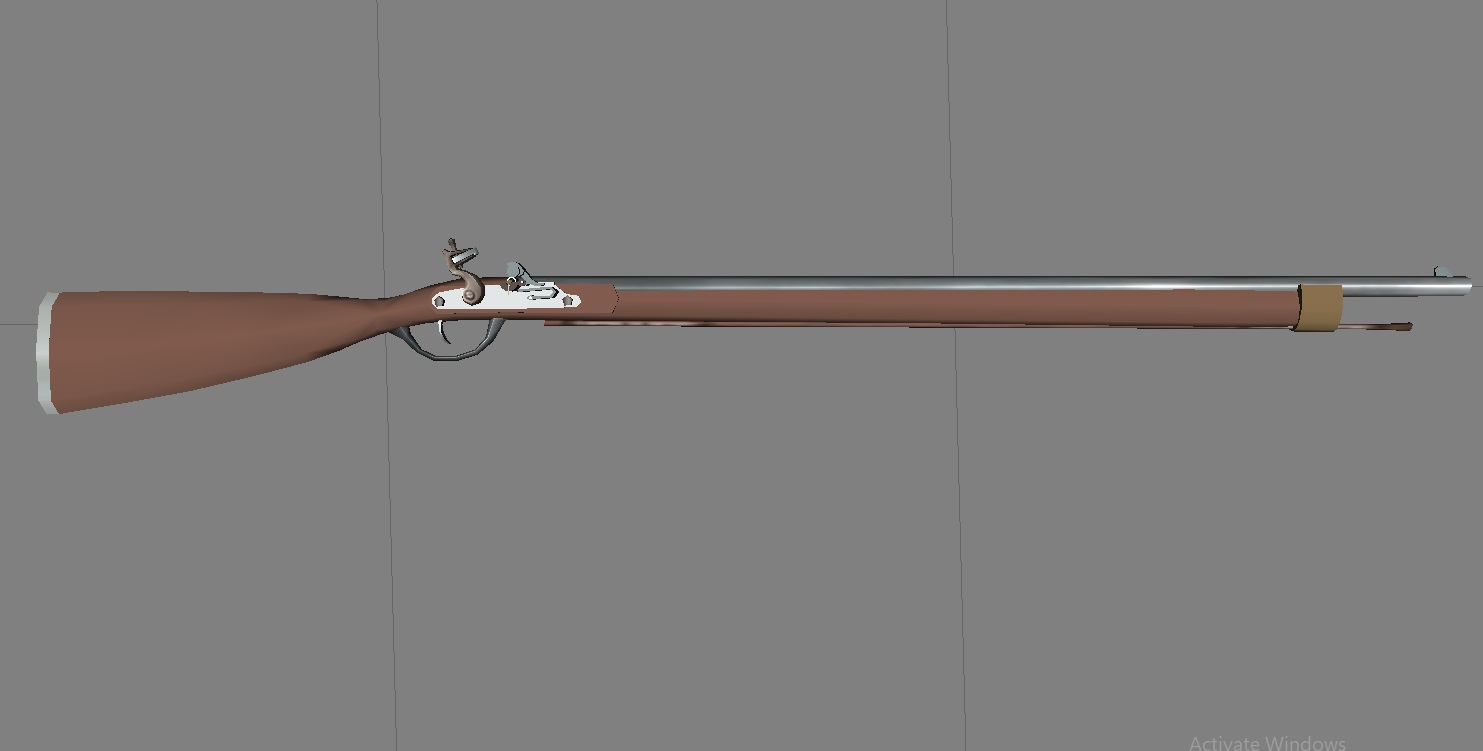
The same gun with the priming pan open to receive a percussion tube

Console percussion musket was an early Austrian percussion firearm fitted with the tube lock ignition system developed by Giuseppe Console. The system was designed as a means of converting existing flintlock firearms to percussion ignition. Unlike the conventional percussion cap, the Console system used a separate percussion tube as its primer. The system was developed in the early 1830s and was adopted for the conversion of several thousand Austrian military flintlock rifles, carbines, and other firearms between 1835 and 1838.

The Console system represented an early Austrian attempt to modernize existing flintlock arms during the transition to percussion ignition. Several Austrian military arms were converted to the system, including the Jäger-Stutzen M. 1838 and Jäger-Karabiner M. 1838, as well as cavalry arms converted to the Kavallerie-Stutzen M. 1835. The system was subsequently superseded by the Augustin tube-lock system, which incorporated modifications to the Console design and was adopted by the Austrian military from 1840.

== History ==
The advantages of the percussion lock—called in Austria simply the "capsule lock"—led to its adoption in most European countries between 1825 and 1840, for military, hunting, and luxury rifles. In Austria, however, in 1830. the official military commission rejected the percussion cap as unsuitable for war and too small and tiny for the soldier's hands—although percussion caps were already produced in Austria at the time—and turned to chemical locks, where the primer was used in metal tubes, some of which could be inserted into the flash hole.

=== Console percussion lock ===
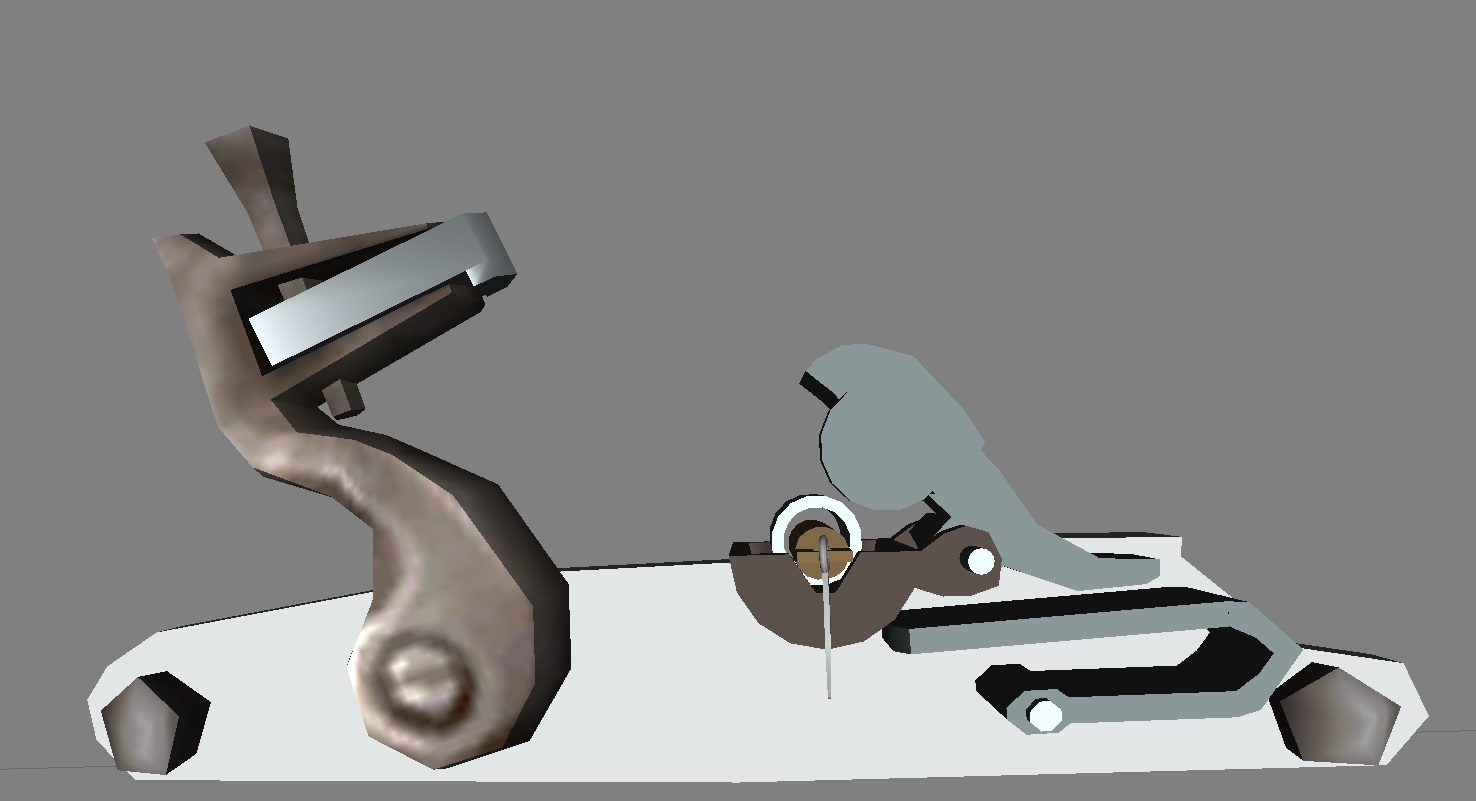
Console musket tube lock, with pan cover (lid) open to show primer tube inside

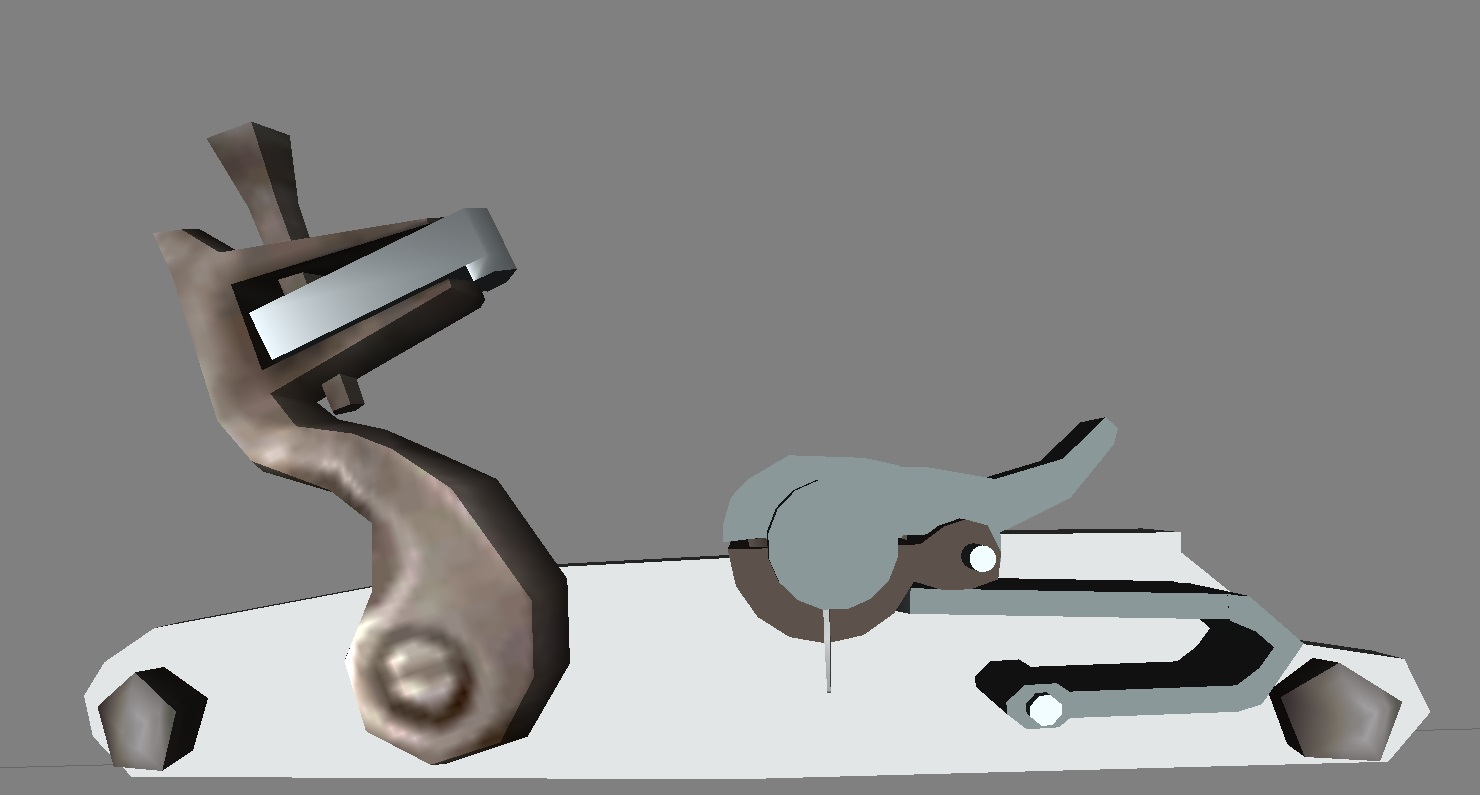
Console musket lock closed and ready to fire

An original form of percussion lock was invented in 1830. by the Austrian tax official Giuseppe Console in Milan. Instead of the classical percussion cap, Console attached a piece of straw to a string and filled it with a mixture of potassium chlorate and blackpowder, making that way a primer tube. When subjected to the hammer blow, the primer tube would explode. Replacing straw with a cylinder of rolled copper sheet (10–15 mm long, 2–3 mm in diameter) attached to a wire suitable for gripping (and binding to the paper cartridge), Console developed a primer tube suitable for military use. He also developed a simple percussion lock, ideal for quick and cheap conversion of the large stock of the existing Austrian military flintlock weapons (600–700,000 muskets and rifles).

Console percussion lock retained most of the old flintlock parts: it needed only a new priming pan (iron groove with a short tube at the left side, next to the touch-hole) and a spring-loaded pan cover, with a protrusion (tooth) on the lower side. The old flintlock hammer could also be used, by clamping a piece of iron between its yaws instead of the flint.

The groove corresponded to the firing hole, and the sausage-shaped "igniter" (priming tube) was inserted into it and held in place by the pan cover. The blow of the hammer—the old cock remained, but with a piece of iron screwed in instead of the flint—on the lid caused the explosion.

Testing in 1835 showed that Console muskets were superior to flintlocks both in the rate of fire (12 to 5 shots respectively) and reliability. The rate of misfire for Console muskets was about 10%, compared to 20-30% for flintlock weapons. However, it was much worse than less than 1% for the standard caplock weapons of the day.

=== Conversion of flintlock weapons in 1835-1838 ===
After repeated trials and testing of various Console lock models, Console's invention was adopted in 1838, and fitted to the flintlock rifles of the several Jäger battalions in Vienna, Moravia, and Tyrol. These were not new weapons, but converted old flintlocks equipped with new Console percussion locks, both rifled and smoothbore ones. The converted infantry weapons were Jaeger short rifle M1838 (Jägerstutzen M. 1838) and smoothbore Jaeger carbine M1838 (Jäger-Karabiner M. 1838). In 1838, several thousand of the smoothbore flintlock Jaeger carbines M1807 (Jäger-Carabiner M. 1807) received the Console tube lock and became Jaeger carbine M1838. From 1842 onwards, they were all converted to Augustin lock.

Console percussion locks were also installed on some cavalry rifled carbines, that were renamed Cavalry short rifle M1835 (Kavallerie-Stutzen M. 1835).

List of the Austrian Console-lock military weapons
Weapon	Original name	Year of production	Caliber (mm)	Bore	Length (cm)	Mass (kg)	Price (florins)	Converted flintlock weapon
Cavalry short rifle M1835	Cavallerie-Stutzen M. 1835	1835	15.6	Rifled, 8 grooves	69	2.5	11.60	Cavallerie-Stutzen M. 1798
Jaeger short rifle M1838	Jäger-Stutzen M. 1838	1838	13.9	Rifled, 7 grooves	105.2	3.8	12.50	Jäger-Stutzen M. 1807
Jaeger carbine M1838	Jäger- Karabiner M. 1838	1838	17.6	Smooth	123	3.8	9.32	Jäger-Karabiner M.1807

However, further production was suspended because Baron Augustin, who had meanwhile been appointed Director of Weapons Factory in Vienna, came up with an improvement to the Console lock, with which (by the imperial order of December 21, 1840) all rifles were to be equipped.

=== Augustin percussion lock ===
The fact that the spring-loaded lid often activated the easily detonated primer tube when closed prompted Baron Augustin, to incorporate a tooth into the lid that could be easily moved up and down. Thus, with a minor design change, the Augustin tube lock was created. Overshadowing Console's invention, it was initially introduced in 1840 as the "large Augustin tube lock" and produced by reconstructing the old locks. However, as early as 1842, it was delivered as a "small Augustin lock or machine lock" by the Brevillier company in Vienna, using a new process for hardened casting. The movable tooth in the pan lid underwent design changes in 1845 and 1846. All firearms in Austria from 1798 onwards received new locks.

== Gallery ==
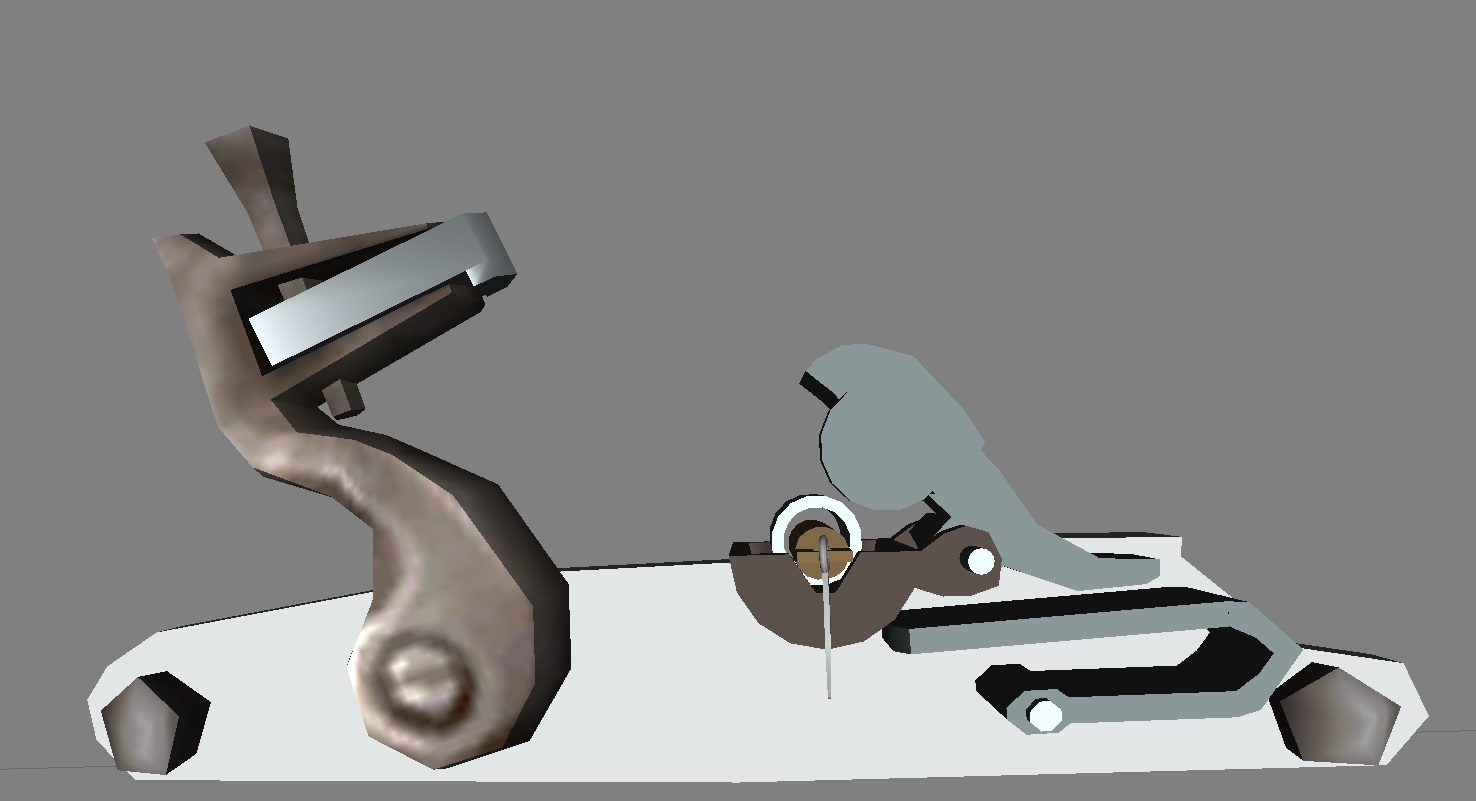
Console musket tube lock, with pan cover open to show percussion tube inside

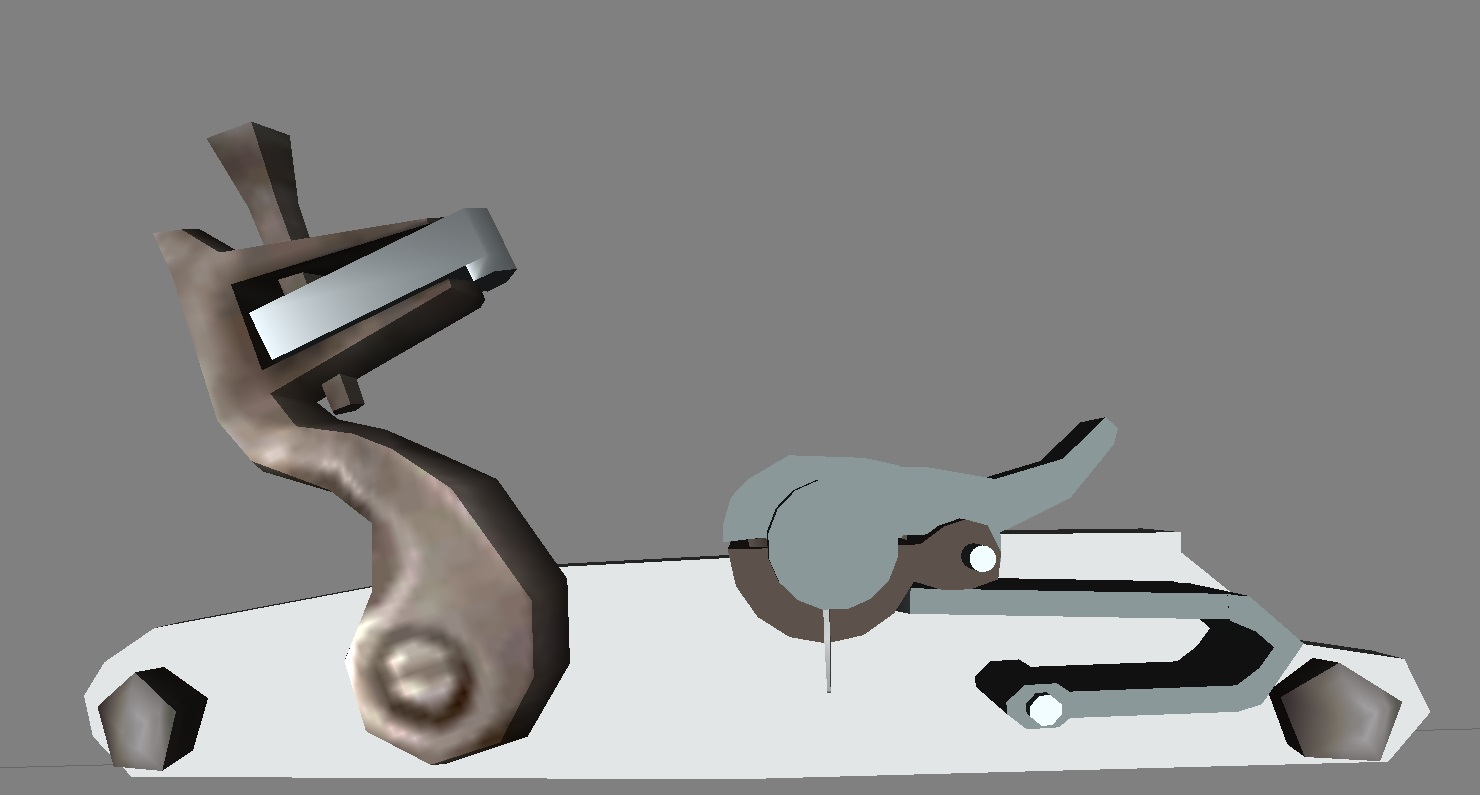
Console musket lock closed and ready to fire

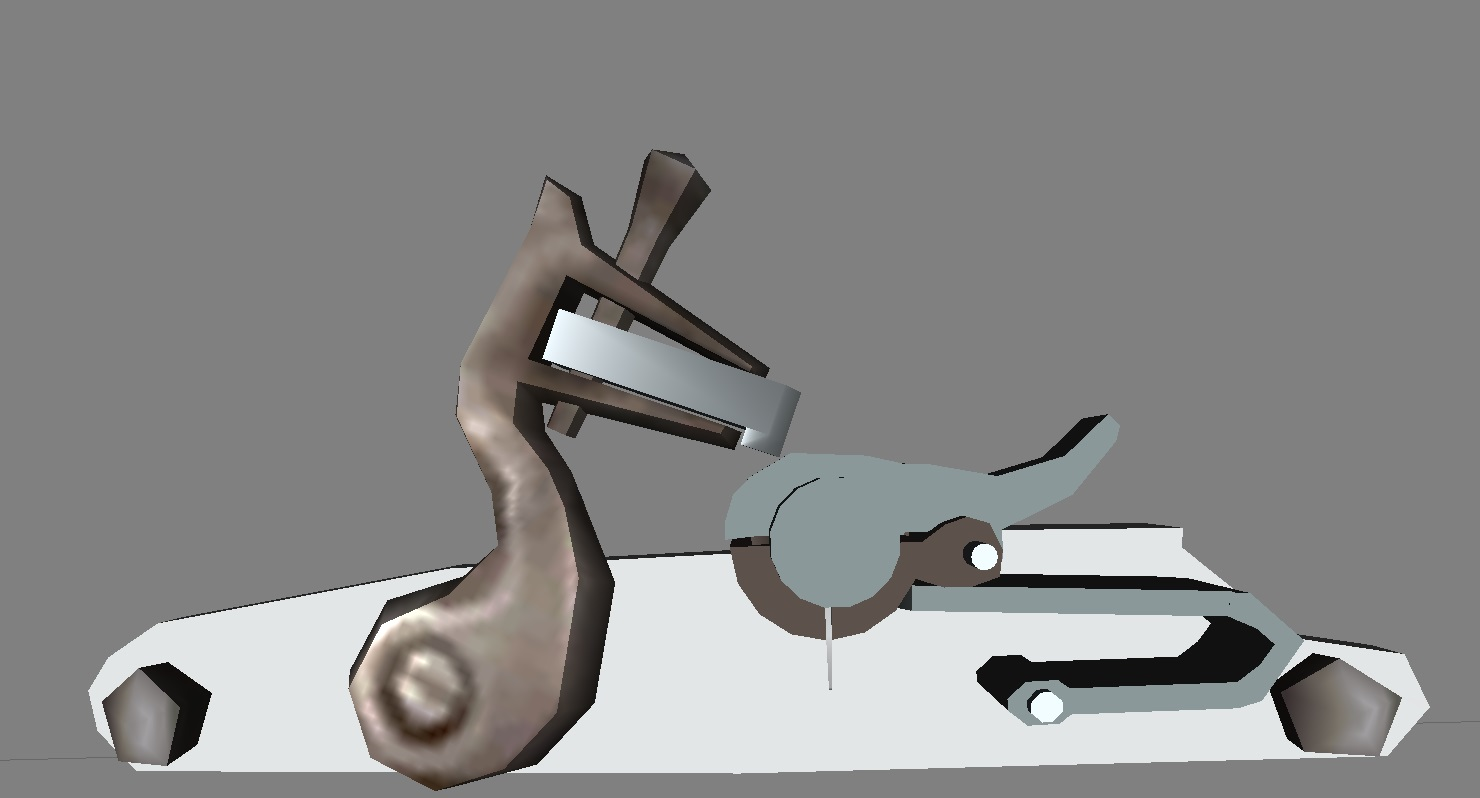
Console musket lock fired: original flintlock hammer with a piece of steel in its jaws would strike the pan-cover and detonate the percussion tube in the pan.

== Literature ==
- Németh, Balázs (2020). Early Military Rifles 1740–1850. London: Bloomsbury Publishing. pp. 25–29. ISBN 978-1-472-84229-9.
- Bogdanović, Branko; Valenčak, Ivan (1990). Puške: dva veka pušaka na teritoriji Jugoslavije [Rifles: two centuries of rifles in the territory of Yugoslavia] (in Serbian) (1. ed.). Beograd: DP Sportinvest [u.a.] pp. 45–47. ISBN 978-86-7597-001-9.
- Dolleczek, Anton (1896). Monographie der k. und k. osterr.-ung. blanken und Handfeuer-Waffen [Monograph of the Imperial and Royal Austrian-Hungarian edged weapons and firearms] (PDF) (in German). Vienna: Kreisel & Gröger. pp. 90–93, 119–120, 205.
- Teuber, Oscar; von Ottenfeld, Rudolf (1895). Die österreichische Armee von 1700 bis 1867 [The Austrian Army from 1700 to 1867] (PDF) (in German). Vienna: Emil Berté & Cie und S. Czeiger. pp. 843–853.
- Morin, Marco (1981). Le Armi Portatili Dell'impero Austro Ungarico [The Portable Weapons of the Austro-Hungarian Empire] (in Italian). FIRENZE: EDITORIALE OLIMPIA. pp. 25–30.
