= Peter Hawker =

English author (1786–1853)

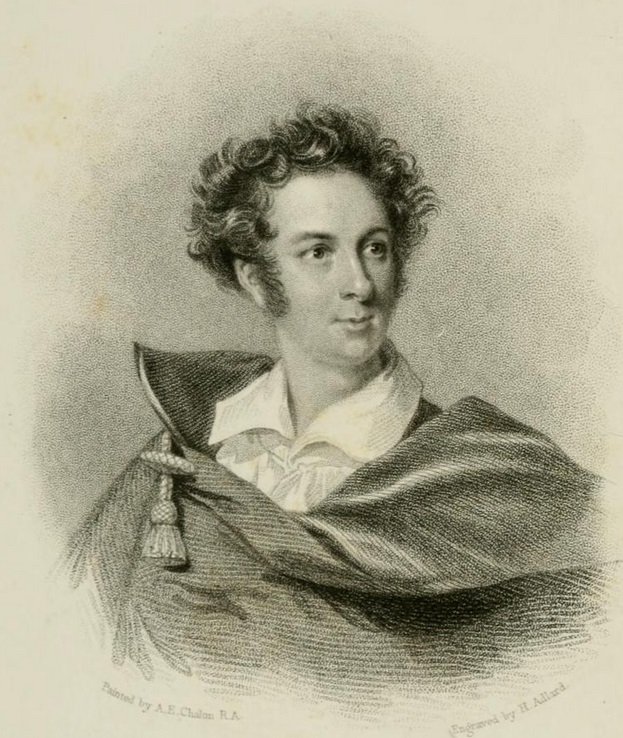
- An engraving of Peter Hawker c. 1814 by H. Adlard, from a portrait by Alfred Edward Chalon
- Born: 24 November 1786; London, United Kingdom
- Died: 7 August 1853 (aged 67); London, United Kingdom
- Occupation: Non-employed
- Known for: Diarist, sportsman, soldier, shot
- Spouses: Julia Barttelot (m. 1811; died 1844): Helen Susan Symonds
- Children: 4
- Relatives: Mary Elizabeth Hawker (granddaughter)

Colonel Peter Hawker (24 November 1786 – 7 August 1853) was a celebrated diarist and author, and a shooting sportsman accounted one of the "great shots" of the 19th century. His sporting exploits were widely followed and on occasion considered worth reporting in The Times.

== Early life ==
Born in London to Colonel Peter Ryves Hawker and Mary Wilson Hawker (née Yonge), Peter Hawker was educated at Eton. He entered military service in 1801 by purchasing a commission as a cornet in The Royal Dragoons (1st Dragoons), soon gaining a purchased promotion to captain. Hawker notes in his diary that: "I was a Captain of Dragoons soon after I was seventeen years old, but paid dearer for it than anyone in the service."

== Military career ==
Hawker served with the 14th Light Dragoons under the Duke of Wellington during the Peninsular War. He led his squadron in the Battle of Douro (6 May 1809), thereby earning the battle honour "Douro" for his regiment's colours. He received a severe thigh wound in the following Battle of Talavera (28 July 1809), was declared unfit, and so resigned and sold his commission. In recognition of his service, Hawker was awarded a modest annual pension of £100. Despite his injuries and consequent ill health, he was later able in 1815 to accept an active commission as major of the North Hampshire Militia; he was recommended for the post by the then Duke of Clarence, heir to the throne and future King William IV. Hawker was made a lieutenant-colonel of the militia in 1821 and ultimately became deputy lieutenant for his county.

== Sportsman and author ==
Hawker is best known today for his published works on the sporting activities of shooting, waterfowl hunting, and fishing. Hawker published his Advice to Young Sportsmen in 1814, a popular work with nine impressions in his lifetime, the latest paper edition appearing in 1975. Forty years after Hawker's death, an Australian book reviewer stated, "Probably no book on the subject of sport ever enjoyed so wide or so long sustained a popularity as the Instructions to Young Sportsmen".

Hawker kept a regular diary that contains observations of Europe before and after the Napoleonic period and of waterfowl hunting and game-bird shooting, as well as detailed descriptions of hunting techniques and conditions prevalent in the late 18th and early 19th centuries. His diary, printed in an abridged form in two volumes, became a popular work. The most recent edition was published in 1988. Hawker also published an originally anonymous memoir of the Peninsular War.

== Revisionist views ==
Hawker's attitudes to guns and shooting have been criticised and parodied from a modern viewpoint in The Economist (in connection with teaching children how to shoot), and in The Times (as being overly bloodthirsty). He was even mildly criticised by Sir Ralph Payne-Gallwey, who described Hawker as "something of an egotist" albeit a "good-natured" one) in the introduction to the 1893 edition of the diary. Colin Laurie McKelvie, in a forward to the 1988 edition of the diary, found Hawker's personality "unattractive" and observed that he "appears unacceptably self-absorbed, cock-sure and downright arrogant." McKelvie mitigates this criticism by praising Hawker's knowledge, fairness, energy, and enthusiasm.

== The musician ==
Hawker was a keen amateur musician, studying the piano under Henri Bertini and regularly playing the organ at his local church. This interest in music was not limited to playing. He devised and patented a device to assist in piano teaching: his "hand moulds".

== Development of firearms ==
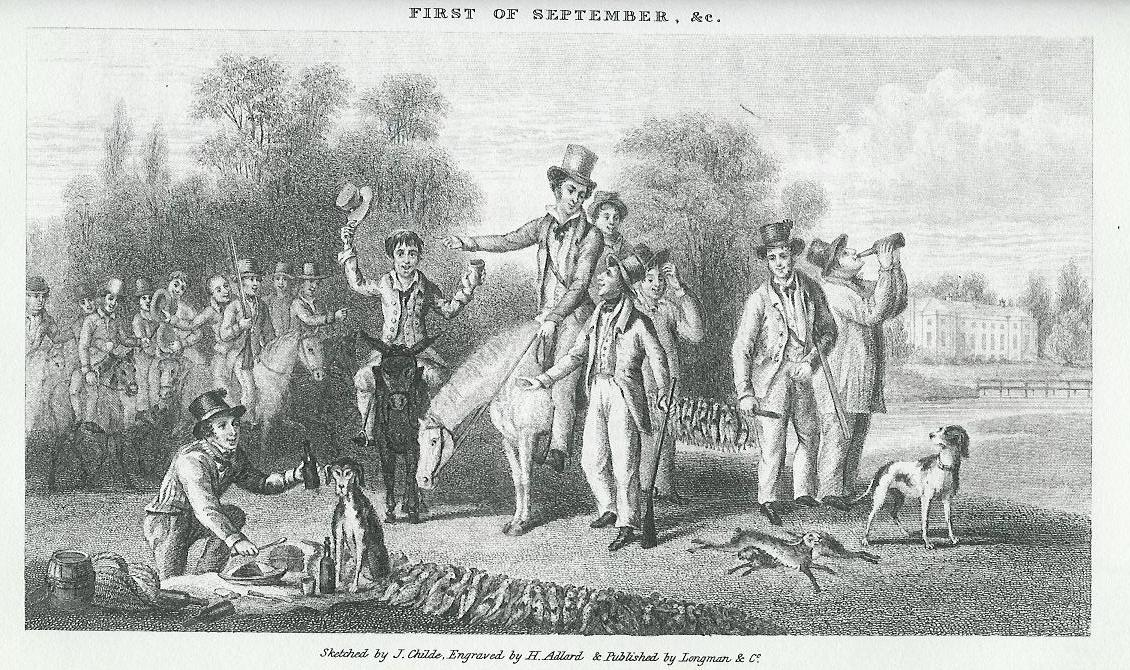
Peter Hawker (Mounted on Grey) talking to Joe Manton 1 September 1827.

Hawker's inventiveness extended to the development of "detonating" firearms – the percussion lock) and punt gunning. He also claims in his diary to have invented a "smokeless chimney". Hawker was a firm friend of the noted gunsmith Joe Manton, using Manton's guns, taking an interest in their design, and participating in the manufacture of some of his own commissions.

Hawker designed a breech-loading swivel gun mounted on a four-wheeled carriage, a model of which was reportedly on display at the Rotunda, Woolwich.

In later life, Hawker designed a "military musket" and commissioned the manufacture of several prototypes at his own expense. Hawker's musket was favourably received by the Board of Ordnance, but it was not adopted, being set aside in preference to the Enfield Rifle-Musket, although elements of Hawker's design were incorporated into the final version of the Enfield.

== Family life ==
Hawker was married first in 1811 to Julia, the only daughter of Major Hooker Barttelot, and the family made their home in Longparish, Hampshire, with a cottage in Keyhaven. After Julia died in 1844, Hawker married Helen Susan Symonds (née Chatterton), who was also a widow. Colonel Hawker had two sons and two daughters by his first wife. Hawker's granddaughter, Mary Elizabeth Hawker, was a noted late Victorian author under the pseudonym "Lanoe Falconer". Hawker's cottage in Keyhaven still stands as "Hawker's Cottage", immediately north of the Gun Inn public house, which reportedly was named originally to mark Hawker's punt-gunning exploits.

Hawker was Lanoe Hawker's great-grandfather through Lanoe's mother.
