= Mary Elizabeth Hawker =

Scottish writer of short fiction (1848–1908)

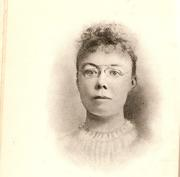
- Born: 28 January 1848; Inveraray, Scotland
- Died: 16 June 1908 (aged 60); Herefordshire, England
- Resting place: Lyonshall, England
- Citizenship: United Kingdom
- Occupation: Writer
- Relatives: Peter Hawker (grandfather)
- Writing career
- Pen name: Lanoe Falconer
- Language: English
- Years active: 1890–1901
- Genre: Mystery

Mary Elizabeth Hawker (28 January 1848 – 16 June 1908) was a Scottish-born writer of short fiction. From 1890, she wrote under the pseudonym Lanoe Falconer.

== Early years and education ==
Mary Elizabeth Hawker was born on 29 January 1848 at Inveraray, Argyllshire, as the oldest daughter of Major Peter William Lanoe Hawker (1812–1857) of the 74th Highlanders, resident at Longparish House near Whitchurch, Hampshire, and Elizabeth Eraser. Her grandfather was Lieutenant Colonel Peter Hawker, author of Instructions to Young Sportsmen published in 1841.

Hawker's education was informal and mainly self-chosen, as she read many books. Her father died in 1857 and her mother remarried in 1862 to Herbert Fennell, with whom the daughter had a poor relationship. The family lived in France and Germany, where Hawker became proficient in both languages. She was also a pianist.

== Career ==
Hawker began to write early in life, a few of her stories and essays appearing in magazines and newspapers. Her first major work, in 1890, was the initial volume of a series of novels included by Fisher Unwin in the Pseudonym Library: a story by Hawker entitled Mademoiselle Ixe, "by Lanoe Falconer". This had been rejected by several other publishers. Her pen name combines an anagram of "Alone" and a synonym for her surname. The story is a mystery about a heroine who is a governess in an English country house connected with Russian nihilists. The Saturday Review declared it to be "one of the finest short stories in England". Gladstone wrote and spoke in praise of the book. Its circulation was forbidden in Russia. She gave her royalties from it to help Russian exiles. Over 40,000 copies of the English editions were sold and an American edition was printed, as were translations into French, German, Dutch, and Italian. She then published Cecilia de Noel, a ghost story, and The Hotel d'Angleterre, both in 1891. Her final book, Old Hampshire Vignettes, appeared in 1907.

Hawker's productivity declined after her mother died on 23 May 1901, as she struggled to maintain her own mental and physical health. She died of consumption on 16 June 1908 at Broxwood Court, Herefordshire and was buried at Lyonshall in the same county. Her nephew – son of her sister, Julia Gordon Lanoe Hawker, and her husband, Henry Colley Hawker, a distant cousin – was the aviator Lanoe Hawker.

== Selected works ==
- Mademoiselle Ixe, 1890
- Cecilia de Noël, 1891
- The Hôtel d'Angleterre and other stories, 1891
- Old Hampshire Vignettes, 1907

Her collected stories were published with an introduction by Peter Rowland in 2010.
