= Nipple wrench (black powder) =

Black-powder firearms tool

Relating to black-powder firearms, a nipple wrench is used to unscrew nipples which hold percussion caps.
