= Augustin percussion musket =

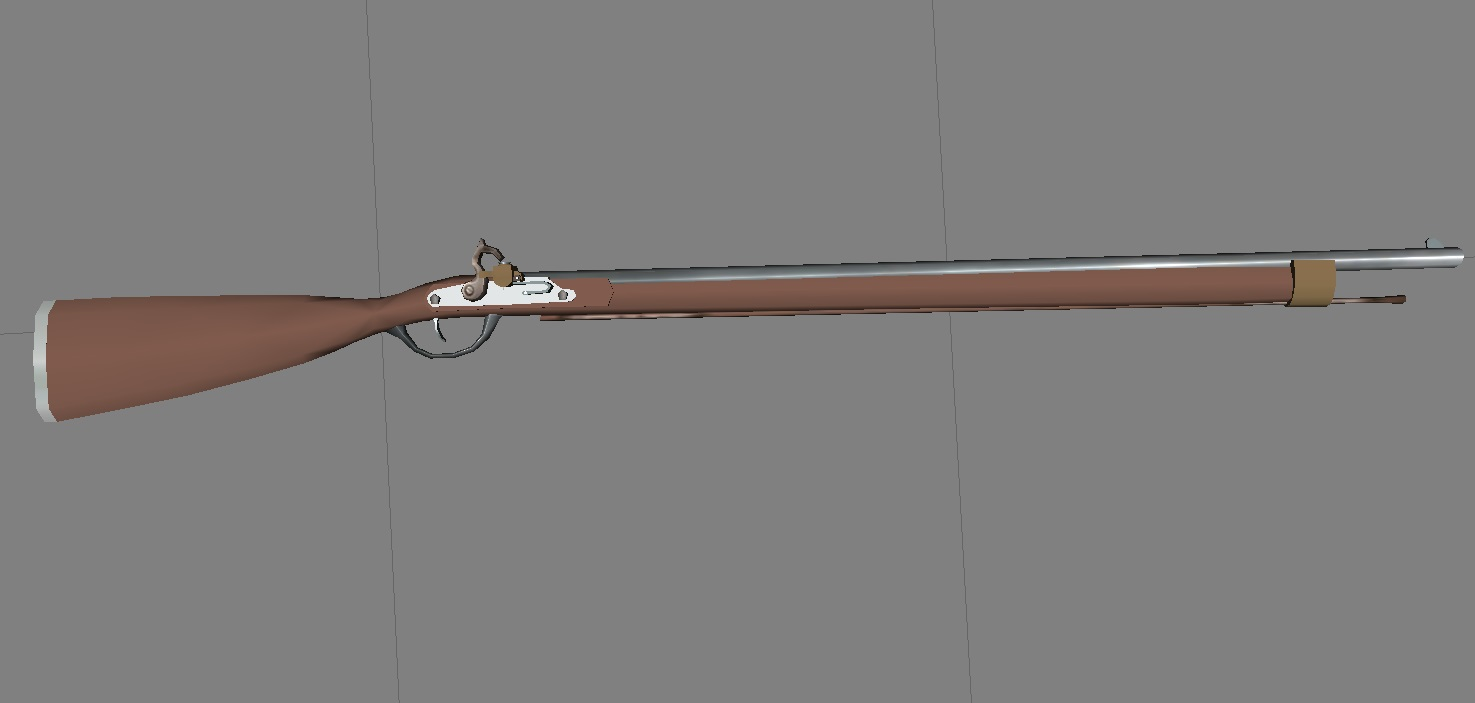
- Augustin percussion musket
- Type: Musket
- Place of origin: Austrian Empire

Service history
- Used by: Austrian Empire

Production history
- Designer: Vincenz von Augustin
- Designed: 1840
- Produced: 1840–1853
- No. built: More than 600,000 new weapons
- Variants: Musket, rifle, carbine

Specifications
- Caliber: .71, .75
- Action: Tube lock
- Feed system: Muzzle-loaded

Augustin percussion musket was an Austrian military firearm of the mid-19th century that used the tube lock ignition system. Developed under Vincenz von Augustin, it represented a further development of the earlier Console tube-lock system. The Augustin system was adopted by the Austrian military during the transition from flintlock to percussion firearms and was used on several types of military firearms during the 1840s and early 1850s.

The Augustin system saw service during the Revolutions of 1848 in the Austrian Empire and the Italian Wars of Independence, among other conflicts involving Austrian forces. Augustin firearms were also exported and subsequently appeared in other countries and conflicts. A small number were present in the American Civil War, where Austrian military firearms were imported into the United States during the conflict.

== History ==
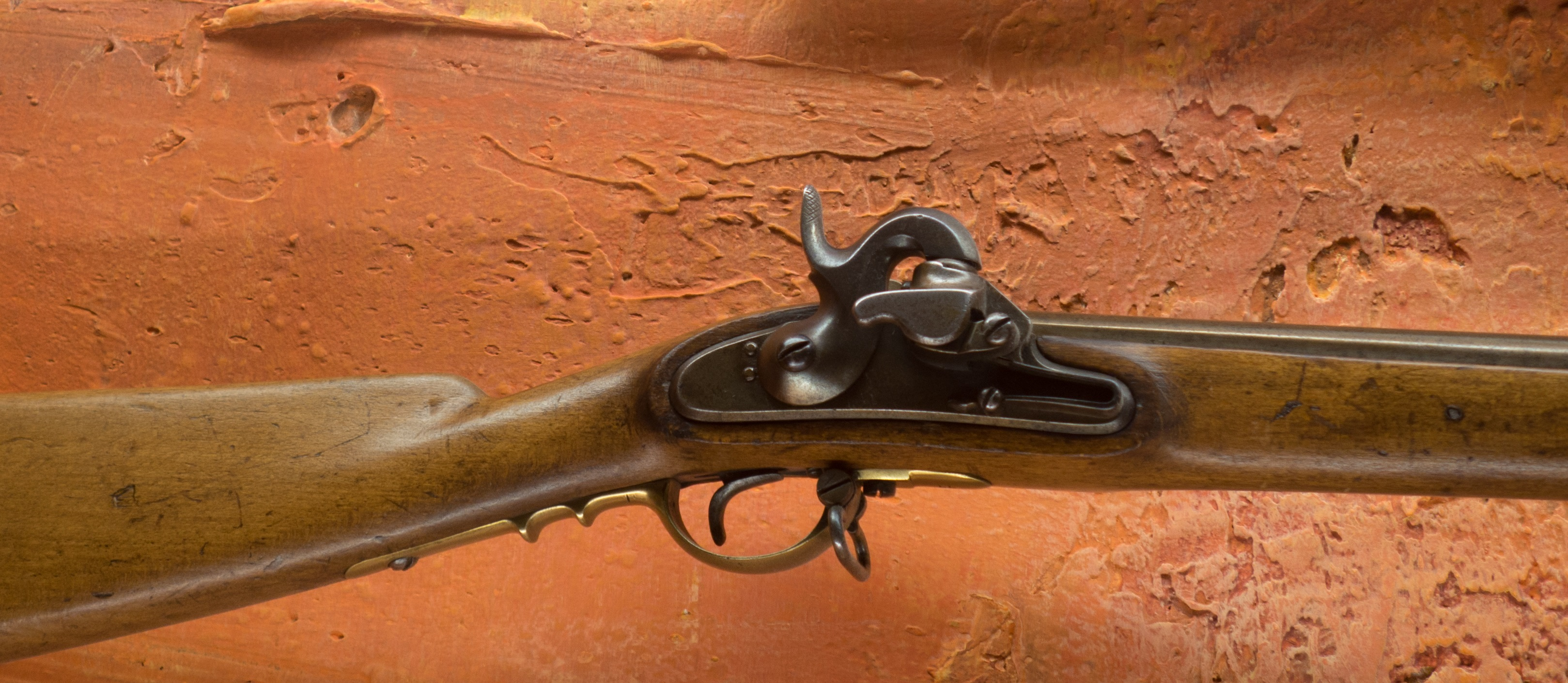
Austrian musket fitted with an Augustin tube lock

The Augustin Infantry Musket was an Austrian musket that was manufactured from 1842 to the early 1850s. The model was a smoothbore and used alternative percussion caps. Designate as the pattern M1842 Kadettengewehre. The weapon was primarily used during the Revolutions of 1848 mainly in the Austrian Empire, as well as the Italian Wars of Independence with minor use in the American Civil War and Mexican forces during the French Intervention in Mexico with the weapon being rebored into a rifle instead of smoothbore. During the Bakumatsu, Scovill, Hartley & Graham supplied Japan with Austrian smoothbore muskets including bayonets, 300 bayonets with scabbards, and 200 Spencer rifles equipped with bayonets, among other surplus weapons; it is unknown how many Augustin rifled musket were imported.

Some Lorenz rifle were confused with or linked to older Console tube-lock conversions, which had a poor reputation. This association unfairly tarnished the Lorenz’s image among troops and collectors.

=== Variant ===
The Model 1842 Austrian carbine is a .75 caliber muzzleloader with a 14 1/2-inch barrel, also known as the Kammer-Karabiner.

The M1849 Kammerbüchse, also known as the Garibaldi rifle during the American Civil War, was a chamber rifling musket designed for the first conical bullet type, the cylindro-conical Spitzkugel. This rifle was produced with the Augustine Console lock ignition system and fired one of the first mass-produced conical rounds. The heavy steel ramrod had a conical cavity matching the tip of the bullet, which was a significant advancement in firearm technology. The M1849 was an improvement over the earlier M1844 Kammerbüchse but was quickly made obsolete by the Muster 1854 System Lorenz family of arms. The M1849 was imported by US purchasing agents during the American Civil Wa, with a total of 26,201 Austrian rifles or "Garibaldi's" officially received by US ordnance officials. The rifle was primarily used in the Western theater of the war, with many state militia units, particularly Wisconsin and Missouri, being equipped with it. The Model 1844 is compatible with the Laukart socket bayonet, and it is plausible that a portion of these units were procured by Confederate speculative buyers, later most captured .71 caliber tube-lock rifle put to use by Confederate troops chamber with three ring bullet.

== See also ==
- Weapons of the Austro-Hungarian Empire
