= Leonori =

Leonori is an Italian surname. Notable people with the surname include:

- Aristide Leonori (1856–1928), Italian architect and engineer
- Pietro Giovanni Leonori (active 1400), Italian painter of the Bolognese school
- Robert G. L. Leonori (1820–1905), American artist
