= Severin Roesen =

American painter

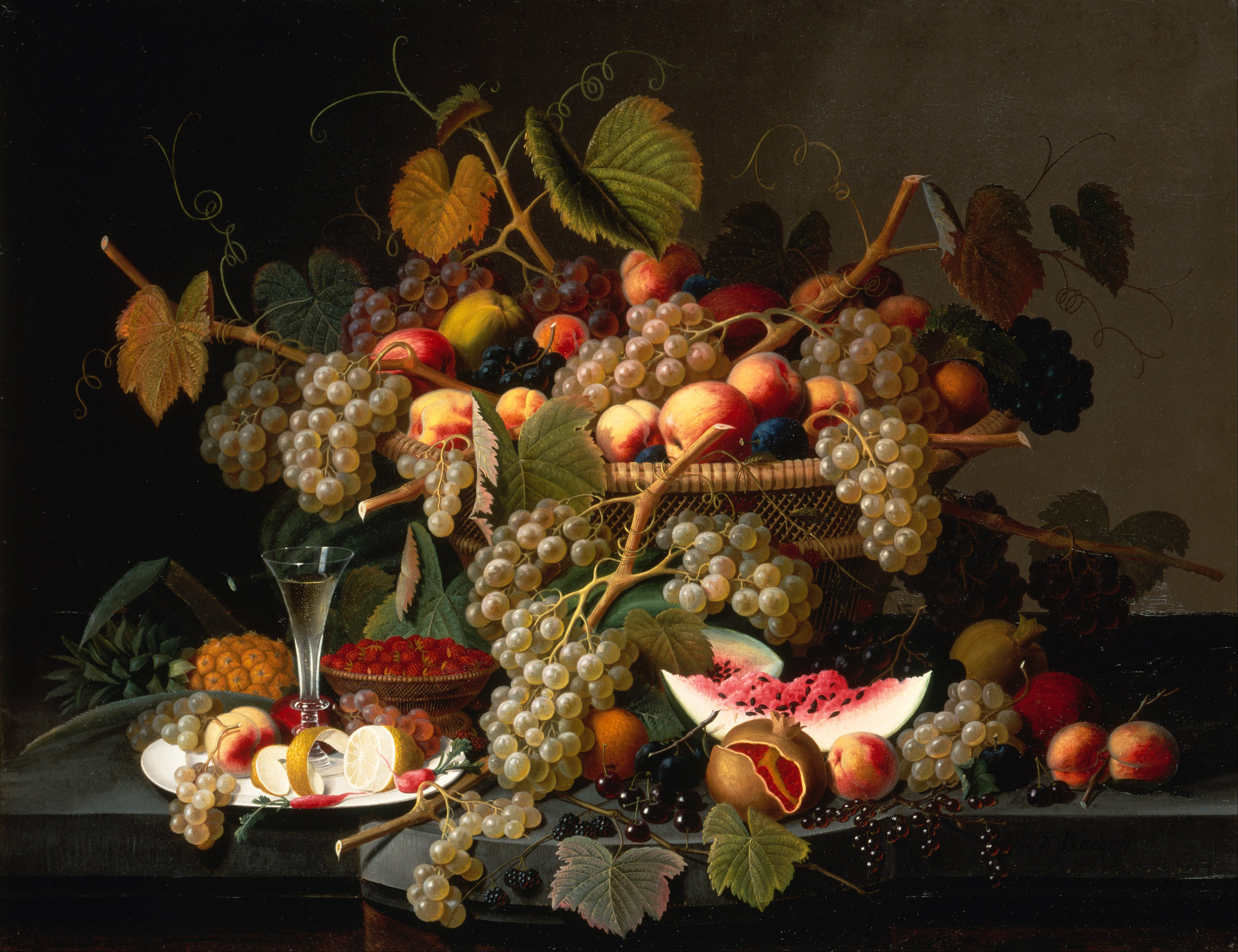
Still Life with a Basket of Fruit,

Severin Roesen (c. 1815 in Boppard – c. 1872) was a Prussian-American painter known for his abundant fruit and flower still lifes, and is today recognized as one of the major American painters in that genre from the nineteenth century.

== Life ==
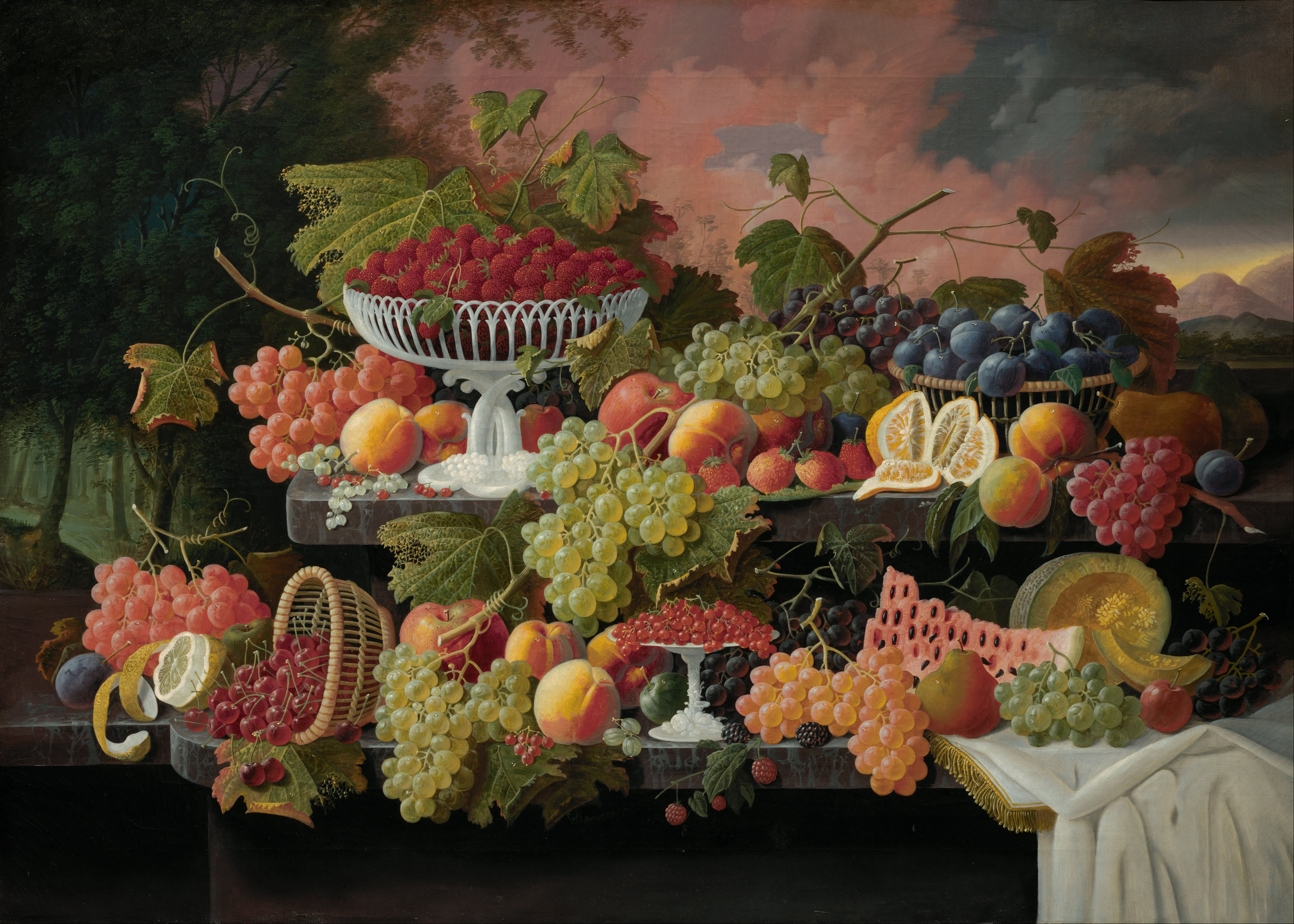
Still Life with Fruit, Nelson-Atkins Museum of Art

Born to Stephanus and Margaretha (née Krebs) in Boppard, Prussia (now Germany), Severin Roesen was born in 1815 and baptized on February 5, 1816. Little is known of his early life and education, though he married Sophia Jacobina Lambricht (born January 22, 1824) on March 10, 1847 at Sankt Kastor Katholisch, Koblenz Stadt, Rheinland. While working as a porcelain painter in Cologne, Roesen exhibited a floral painting at the Cologne local art club in 1847. He and Sophia arrived in Dover, England on December 27, 1847, and from there emigrated to New York, arriving on February 4, 1848, exhibiting eleven paintings there at the American Art-Union over the next five years. Sophia died soon after their arrival in America, and on October 30, 1849, Roesen married Wilhelmine Ludwig (born 1831 in Alzey, Prussia), with whom he went on to have three children; Minnie (born 1854), Oscar (born 1857), and a third child (name and birth date unknown). The marriage took place at the Evangelical Lutheran Church of Saint Matthew in New York City, and Roesen supported the family through sales of his paintings to both private buyers and the American Art Union, as well as through teaching still-life painting. Roesen left his family and moved to Pennsylvania in 1857. He lived briefly in Philadelphia, and then moved to rural German-American communities in Harrisburg, Huntingdon, and finally Williamsport, where he settled around 1863. During this period, he also exhibited works at the Maryland Historical Society in Baltimore in 1858, at the Pennsylvania Academy of Fine Arts in 1863, and at the Brooklyn Art Association in 1873.

The Williamsport Sun and Banner reported in 1895, "His studio was much frequented by his friends, who would sit all day with this genial, well-read and generous companion, smoking his pipes and drinking his beer, which he was seldom without. In one corner of the finished painting would always appear the faint outline of a beer glass, and when a customer objected to its presence, he would say, 'Why, do you not like beer?' and then take it out."

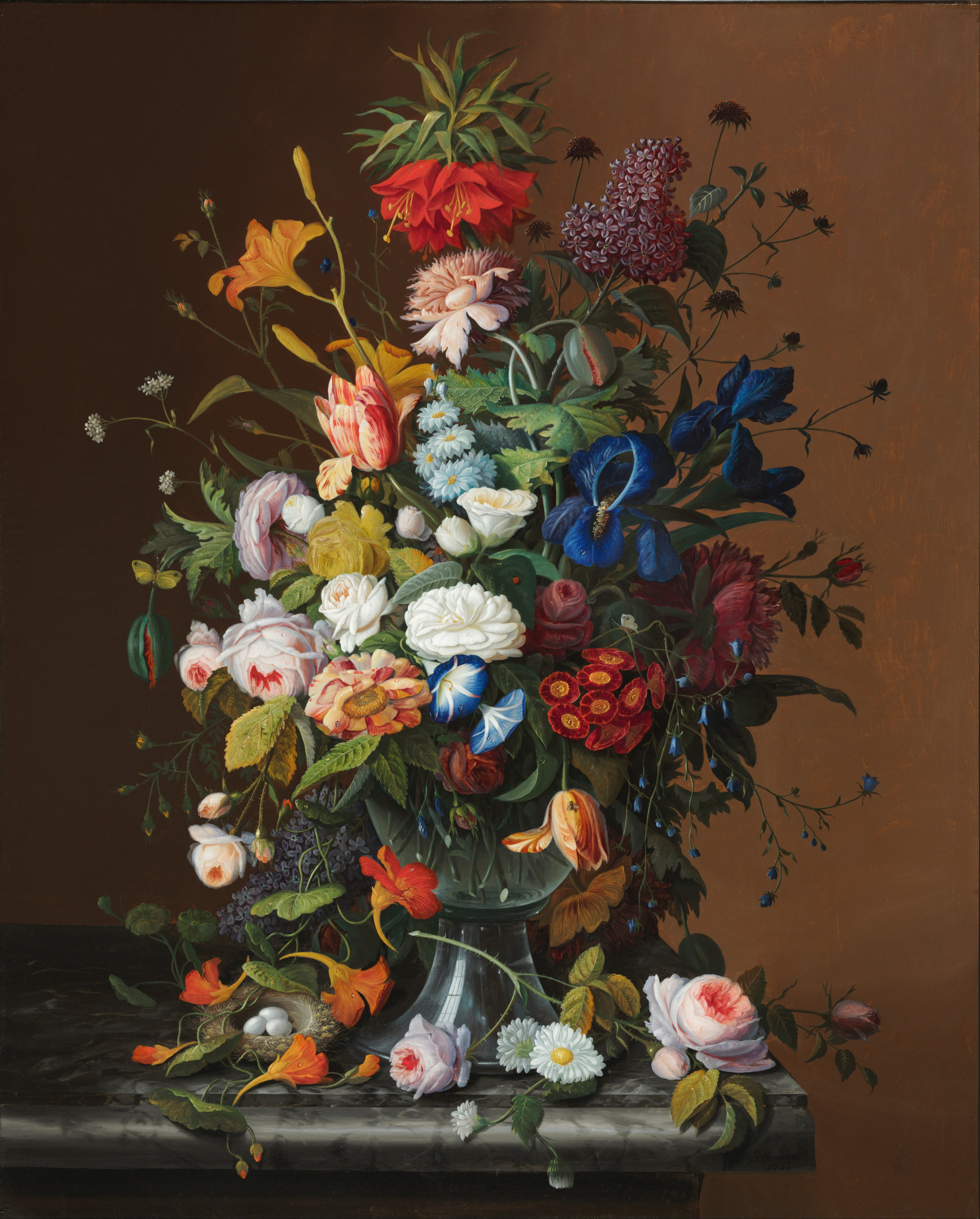
Flower Still Life with Bird's Nest

A large number of Roesen's paintings were discovered in Williamsport. His pictures of nature's abundance found a ready market in the town's growing population (many of German descent) of prosperous merchants and lumbermen, who purchased them to adorn their newly built homes as well as taverns, restaurants, and hotels. One hotelier and brewer, Jacob Flock, owned more than fifty paintings by Roesen, which the artist appears to have traded for lodging and beer.

Roesen's last dated painting is from 1872, at which point all records of his life and residence cease. Information about his life thereafter, as well as the date and place of his death, remains unknown.

== Work ==
Over three hundred still life paintings by Roesen have been recorded, of which only about two dozen are dated.

While Roesen's paintings reveal a meticulous attention to detail in their precise arrangements and close brushwork, his subject matter, even down to specific motifs, did not change throughout his career. Sometimes he made near-identical copies of paintings, but usually he merely rearranged and reassembled stock elements.

Numerous items in Fruit and Wine Glass, for example, also appear in other paintings. A footed dessert plate full of strawberries is a common motif. A pilsner glass, sometimes accompanied by an open bottle of champagne, is interchangeable with a wine goblet filled with lemonade used elsewhere. The glass is nearly always placed at the lower left edge of the painting; a halved lemon often appears nearby. Branches full of grapes arranged from lower left to upper right provide the composition with a graceful S-curve and subtly lead the viewer's eye over the entire display. Here the composition is balanced by light and dark grapes at either side and filled in by scattered raspberries, cherries, peaches, apples, pears, and apricots. Many of these compositional elements, if not the items depicted, were derived from seventeenth-century Dutch still life paintings by such artists as Jan van Huysum.

Severin Roesen's paintings

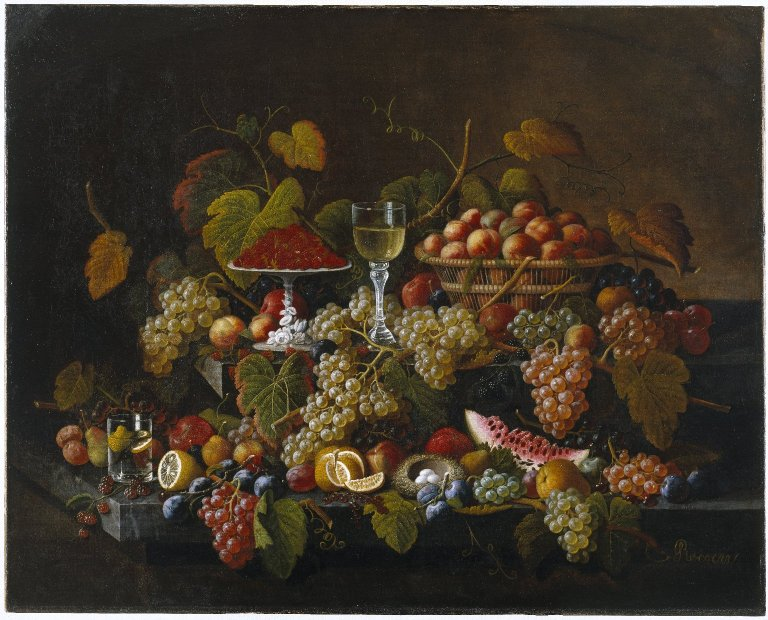
Still Life with Fruit, Brooklyn Museum of Art

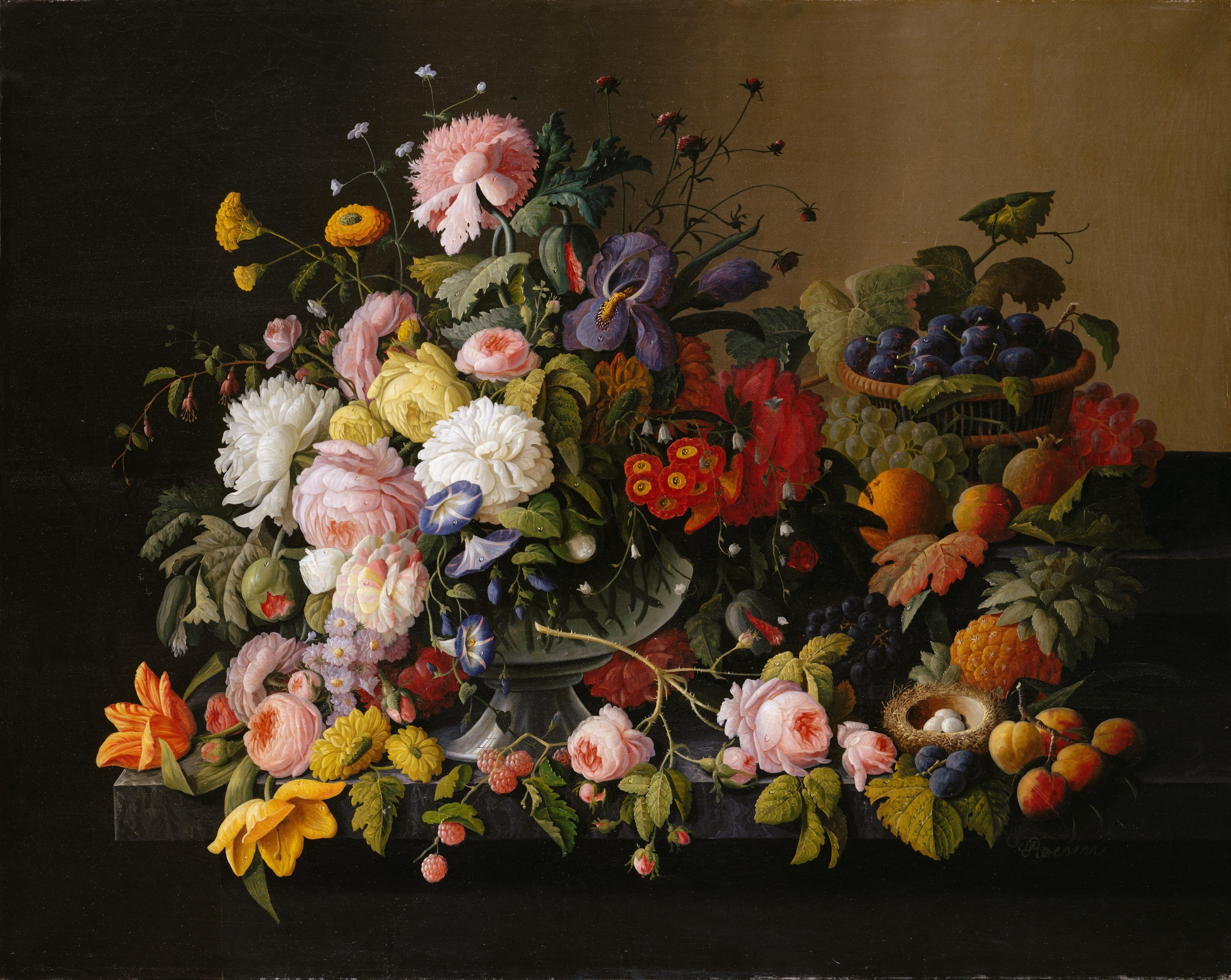
Still Life: Flowers and Fruit, Metropolitan Museum of Art

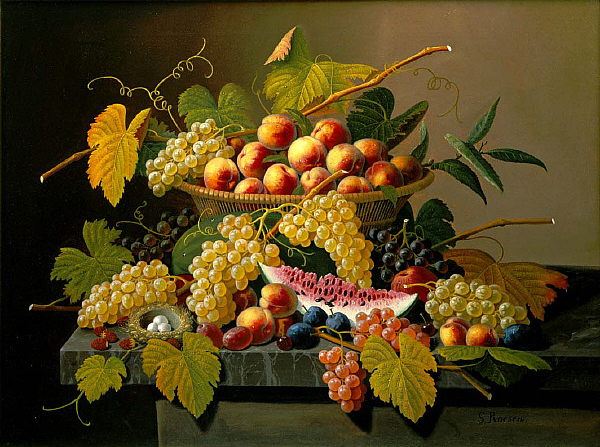
Still Life with a Basket of Fruit, Saint Louis Art Museum

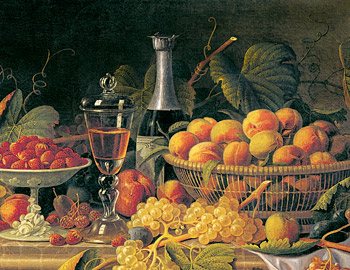
Fruit Holiday (detail)

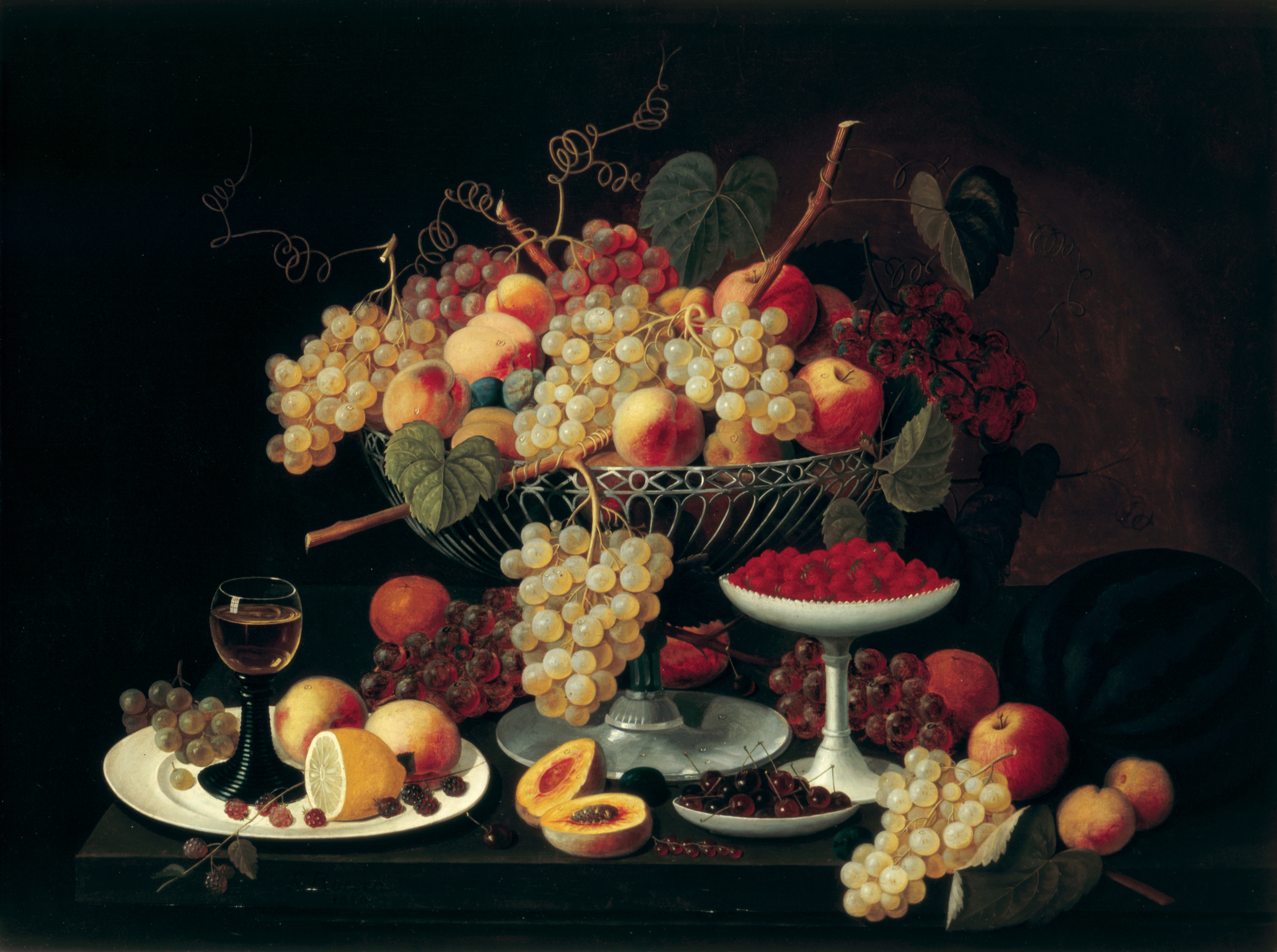
Still Life With Fruit, in the White House

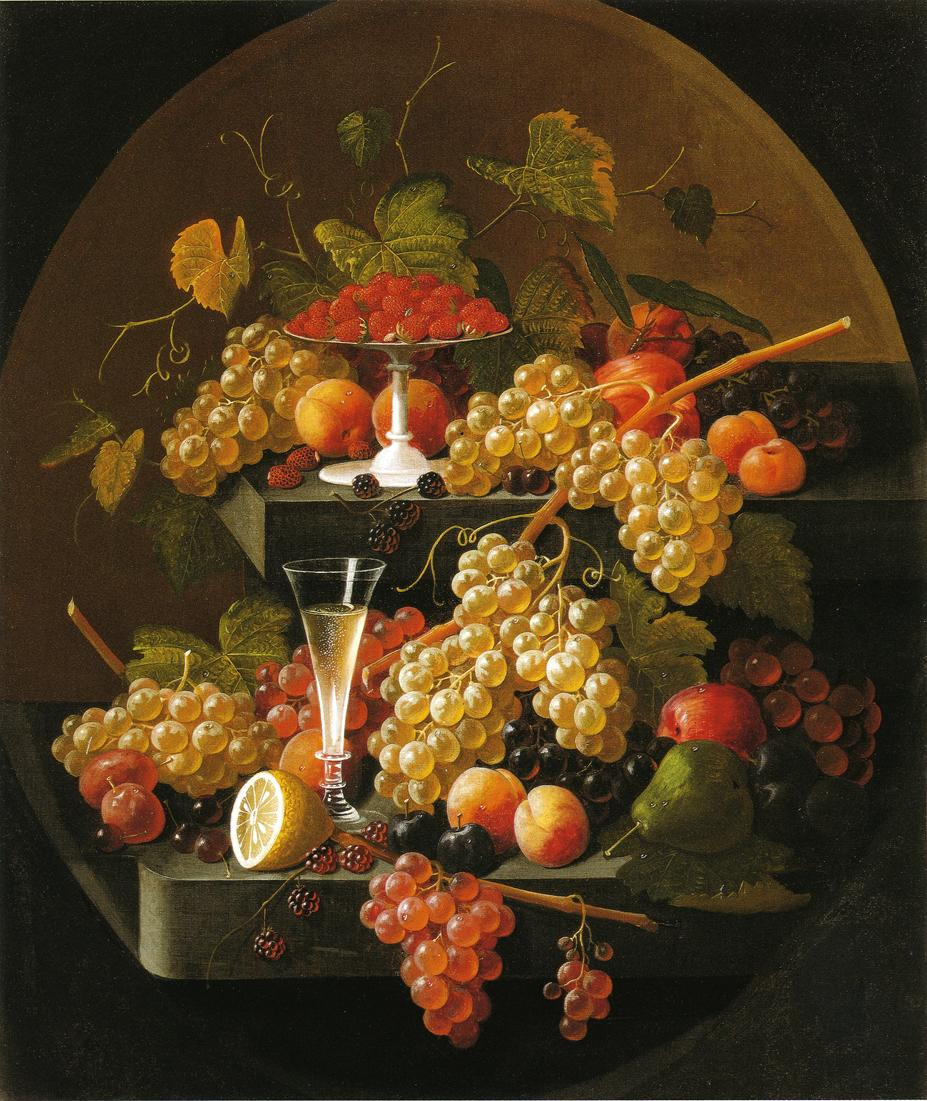
Fruit and Wine Glass

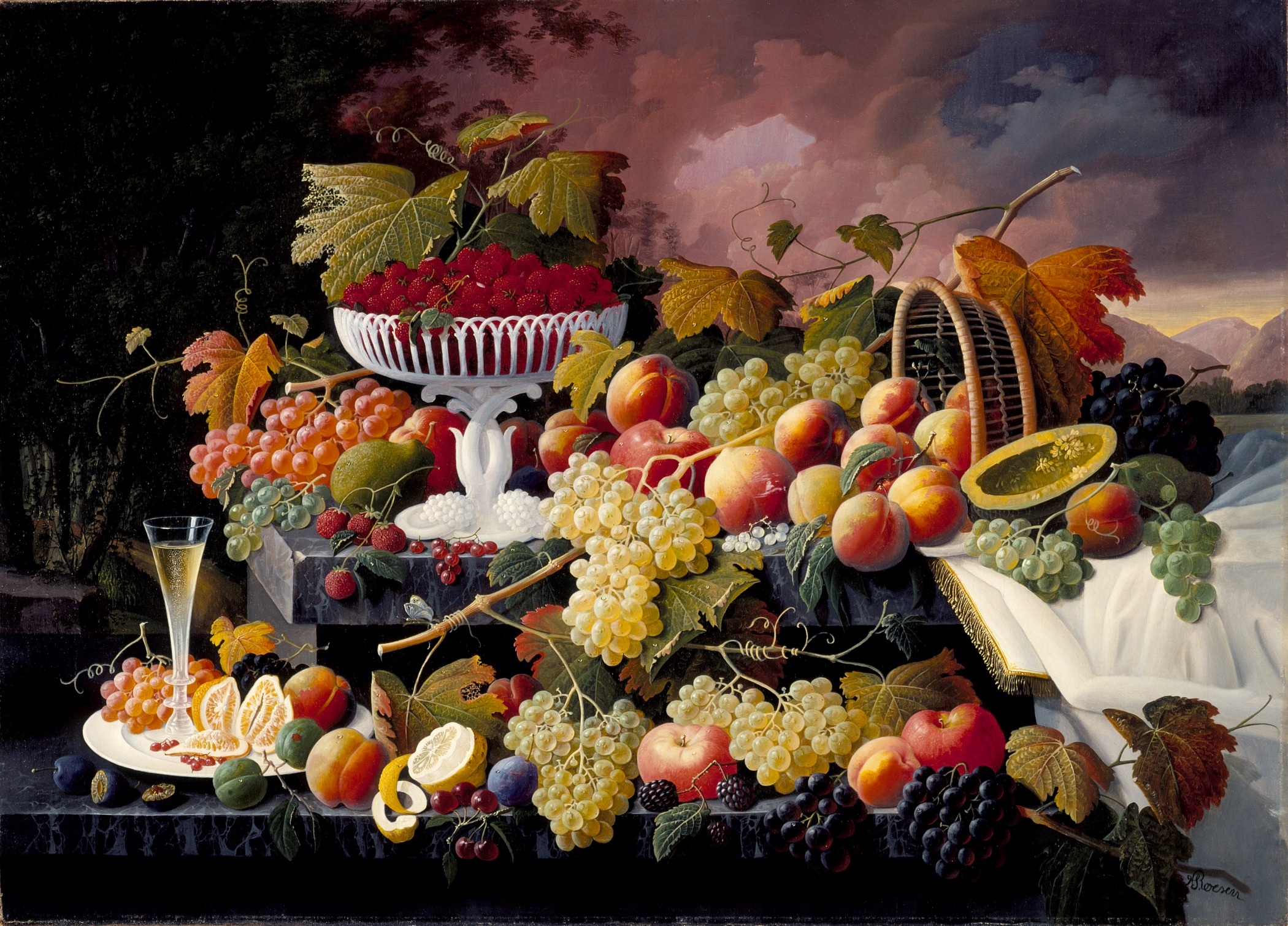
Fruit Still Life in a Landscape

== Literature ==
- Judith Hansen O'Toole: Severin Roesen, Lewisburg, Penn.: Bucknell University Press (1992)
- William H. Gerdts: Painters of the Humble Truth: Masterpieces of American Still Life, 1801-1939, Columbia and London: University of Missouri Press (1981)
