= Christopher Columbus Before the Council of Salamanca =

Painting by Emanuel Leutze

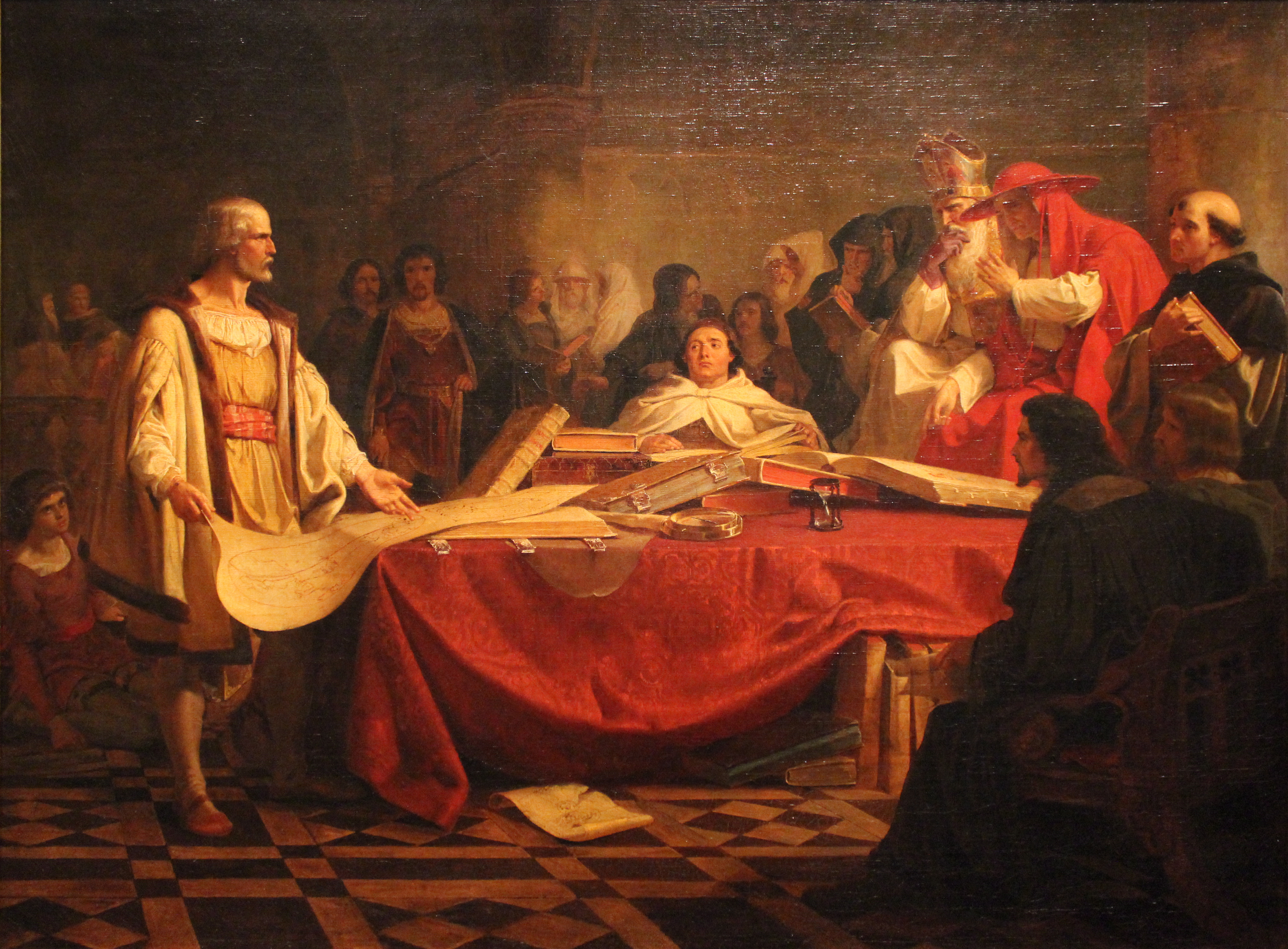
- Artist: Emanuel Leutze
- Year: 1841
- Medium: Oil on canvas
- Dimensions: 91 cm × 115 cm (36 in × 45 in)
- Location: Louvre, Paris

Christopher Columbus Before the Council of Salamanca is an oil-on-canvas painting by the German-American artist Emanuel Leutze, created in 1841. It is held in the Louvre, in Paris. It was lent to the Musée des beaux-arts de Lyon in 2014 for its exhibition L'invention du Passé. Histoires de cœur et d'épée 1802–1850.

== History and description ==
Leutze made this painting shortly after arriving to Düsseldorf, where he came to study at the local arts academy. The work positively impressed their director, Wilhelm von Schadow, who admitted Leutze. The painting was one of a group of six that Leutze executed inspired by Christopher Columbus and the discovery of America. For this scene he took inspiration at the work of the American writer and historian Washington Irving, A History of the Life and Voyages of Christopher Columbus (1828; vol. I, book II, chapter 3). The artist depicts the episode of the reunion of a council of sages, both clergymen and laymen, held in the Convent of San Estebán, in Salamanca, at request of king Ferdinand II of Aragon, to listen the proposal of Columbus of trying to reach Asia by navigating to the West.

Columbus appears at the left, holding and pointing to a large nautical chart, who is at the top of a table covered with a red colored towel, with several large books on top of it. A compass and an hourglass are also seen at the table. Under the table other books are depicted and another nautical chart lies in the ground in front of it. The Genoan navigator seems to be arguing his plan, while several clergymen, including a bishop, who appears thoughtful, listen to him, while also hearing the advice of another member of the clergy. A Dominican friar holds a book, at the right, while other two are seen discussing at the right of the bishop, and another one is seated behind the table, looking to Columbus. At the right side, two layman appear seated and also seem to be listening to Columbus. In the background several people watch the scene or are perhaps discussing his proposal.
