= Robert G. L. Leonori =

American landscape painter

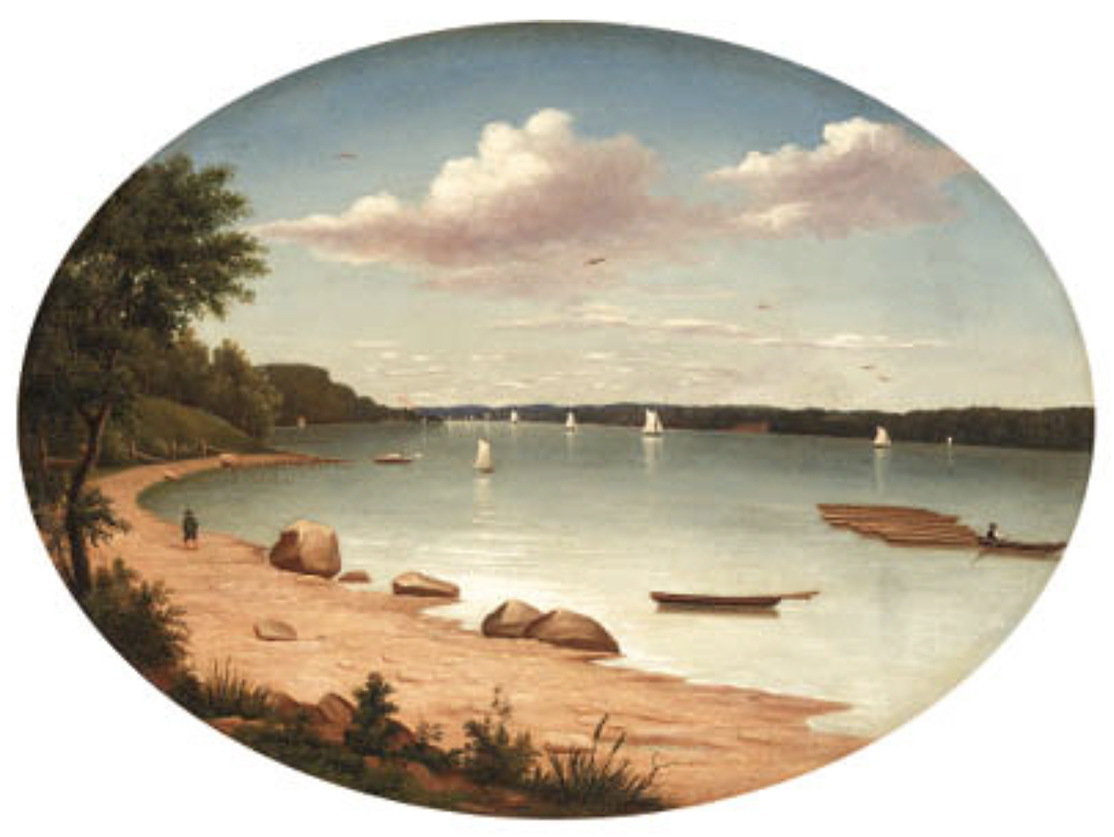
- Seascape - Bull’s Creek, New Jersey by Robert G. Leonori, 1847
- Born: December 1, 1820; New York, United States
- Died: July 25, 1905 (aged 84); New York City, United States
- Known for: Landscape painting
- Notable work: Niagara Falls
- Movement: Hudson River School
- Spouse: Sarah Hatfield

Robert G. L. Leonori (December 1, 1820 – July 25, 1905) was an American artist. Born in New York, he was a member of the American Art-Union and associated with the Hudson River School of landscape painters.

Leonori painted both landscapes and still-lives but he is best known for scenes of the Hudson River Valley, Niagara Falls and the Catskill region of New York state. His work was regularly exhibited at the American Art-Union from 1846 to 1852. An 1848 distribution record shows that five of his paintings had been distributed by the American Art-Union by 1848, a high proportion compared to other artists.

The artist appears to have lived in New York all his life. His name is recorded in connection with the Broadway Tabernacle Church in 1844. New York city directories and censuses show that Leonori lived in various locations in the city from 1871 to 1891.

Robert Leonori's wife, née Margaret S. Hatfield, was a descendant of the Hatfield Family of Elizabeth, New Jersey. The couple married in Essex, New York, on 8 May 1841 with the marriage register showing that the artist was a New York resident in that year.

Robert Leonori died in 1905 in New York City.

Leonori's works have rarely appeared at auctions. In 2000, his Seascape - Bull's Creek, New Jersey, fetched $6,325 with Buyer's Premium, at Christies NY, while a view of Niagara Falls, fetched $3,000 (Lot 188) on 14 December 2005 at Sotheby's New York.

A descendant of Robert G. Leonori, Barbara Peterson (second time great granddaughter) donated works by the artist in 2014 to the Mountainside Restoration Committee responsible for Deacon Andrew Hetfield House, Union County, New Jersey.

== Sources ==
- History of Broadway Tabernacle Church, with some account of the building, and events connected therewith: together with the articles of faith, and covenant and complete catalogues of the members of the church.. New York: S.W. Benedict. 1846. p. 33.
- Hatfield, Abraham (1954). The Descendants of Matthias Hatfield. NY Genealogical and Biographical Society. p. 132.
- M. and M. Karolik Collection of American Paintings, 1815 to 1865. Boston: Museum of Fine Arts, Boston. 1951. p. 36.
- "New Jersey Marriages". New Jersey State Archives, Trenton, New Jersey.
- "Robert G Leonori". Find A Grave.
- "Seascape - Bull's Creek, New Jersey". Sale 8337 (Lot14), American Vision, NY, 19 January 2000. Christie's.
- "Niagara Falls". Arcade Painting (Lot 188), NY, 14 December 2005. Sotheby's.
- "From the Hetfield & Levi Cory Houses" (PDF). MountainsideHistory.org. Mountainside Restoration Committee.
- "Artists Whose Works Have Been Distributed since the Formation of the Institution". Transactions of the American Art-Union: 21–26. 1848. JSTOR 20568445.
