= The Courtship of Anne Boleyn =

Painting by Emanuel Leutze

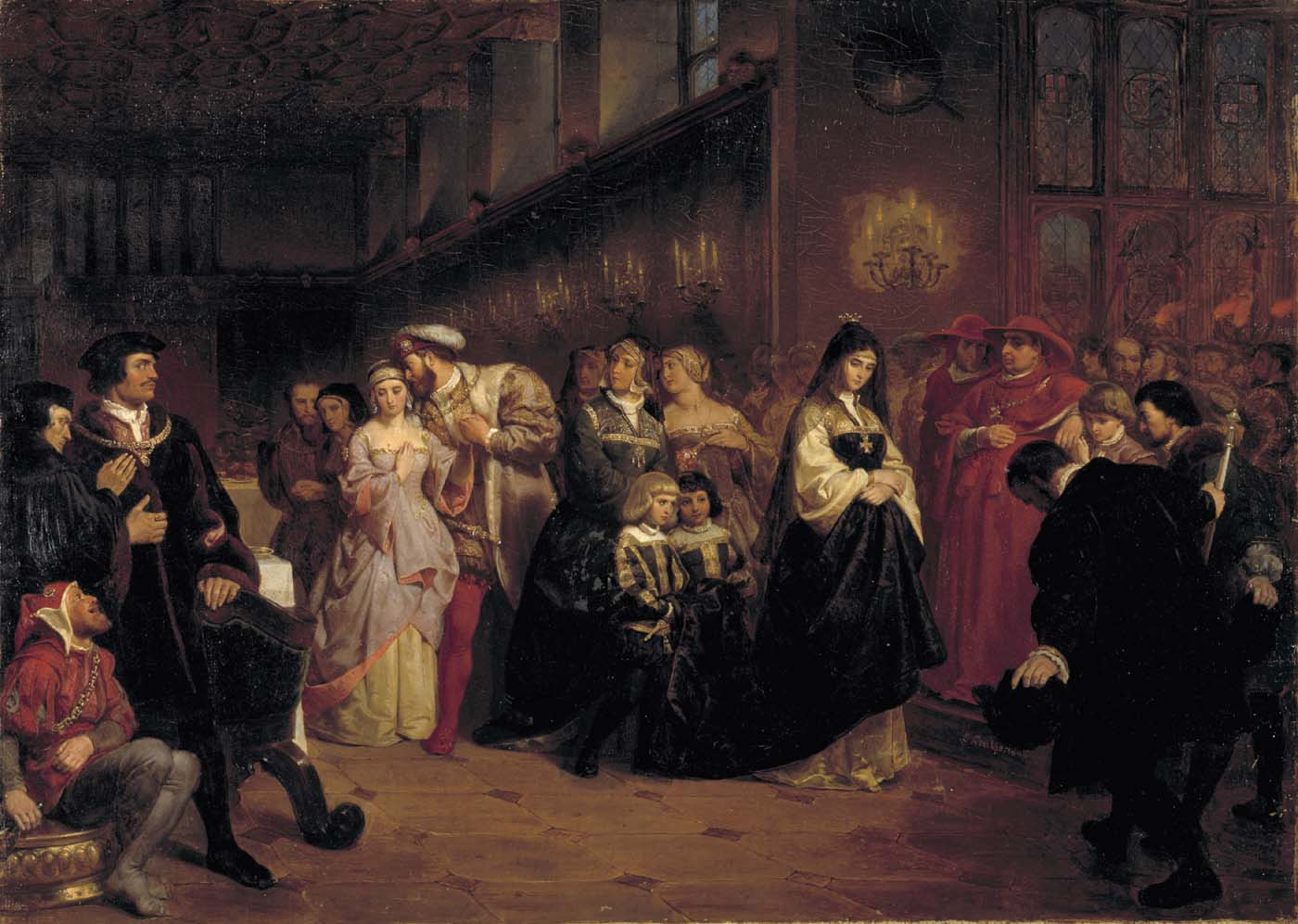
- Artist: Emanuel Leutze
- Year: 1846
- Type: Oil on canvas, history painting
- Dimensions: 72.4 cm × 101.8 cm (28.5 in × 40.1 in)
- Location: Smithsonian American Art Museum, Washington D.C.

The Courtship of Anne Boleyn is an oil on canvas history painting by the German American artist Emanuel Leutze, from 1846. The work is also known as The Great Matter, a reference to the euphemism for the King's attempts to secure a divorce from his first wife. Today it is in the Smithsonian American Art Museum, in Washington DC.

== History and description ==
The painting depicts a scene from Tudor England, during the reign of Henry VIII. The king is shown publicly courting Anne Boleyn, a lady-in-waiting to his first queen Catherine of Aragon.

The king, at the left, is seeing courting Anne, who he presumably already plans to make his future queen. His wife, Catherine of Aragon, seen at the right, dressed in dark clothing, looks down, apparently saddened by what is happening. Her mantle is carried by two children pages. Two ladies-in-waiting of the queen stare concerned at the scene. Cardinal Thomas Wolsey looks from her right, with a more nuanced look, since he is a supporter of the kings divorce. Other members of the court watch the scene, with different reactions. A jester is seated at the bottom left, with an amused look. A nobleman, at the right, dressed in black, bows to the queen, as a sign of respect for her royalty.

== Bibliography ==
- Angus, Caroline. Henry VIII's Children: Legitimate and Illegitimate Sons and Daughters of the Tudor King. Pen and Swordz 2023.
- Dockray, Keith. Henry VIII: The Evolution of a Reputation. Fontill Media, 2017.
