= American Art-Union =

Subscription-based organization

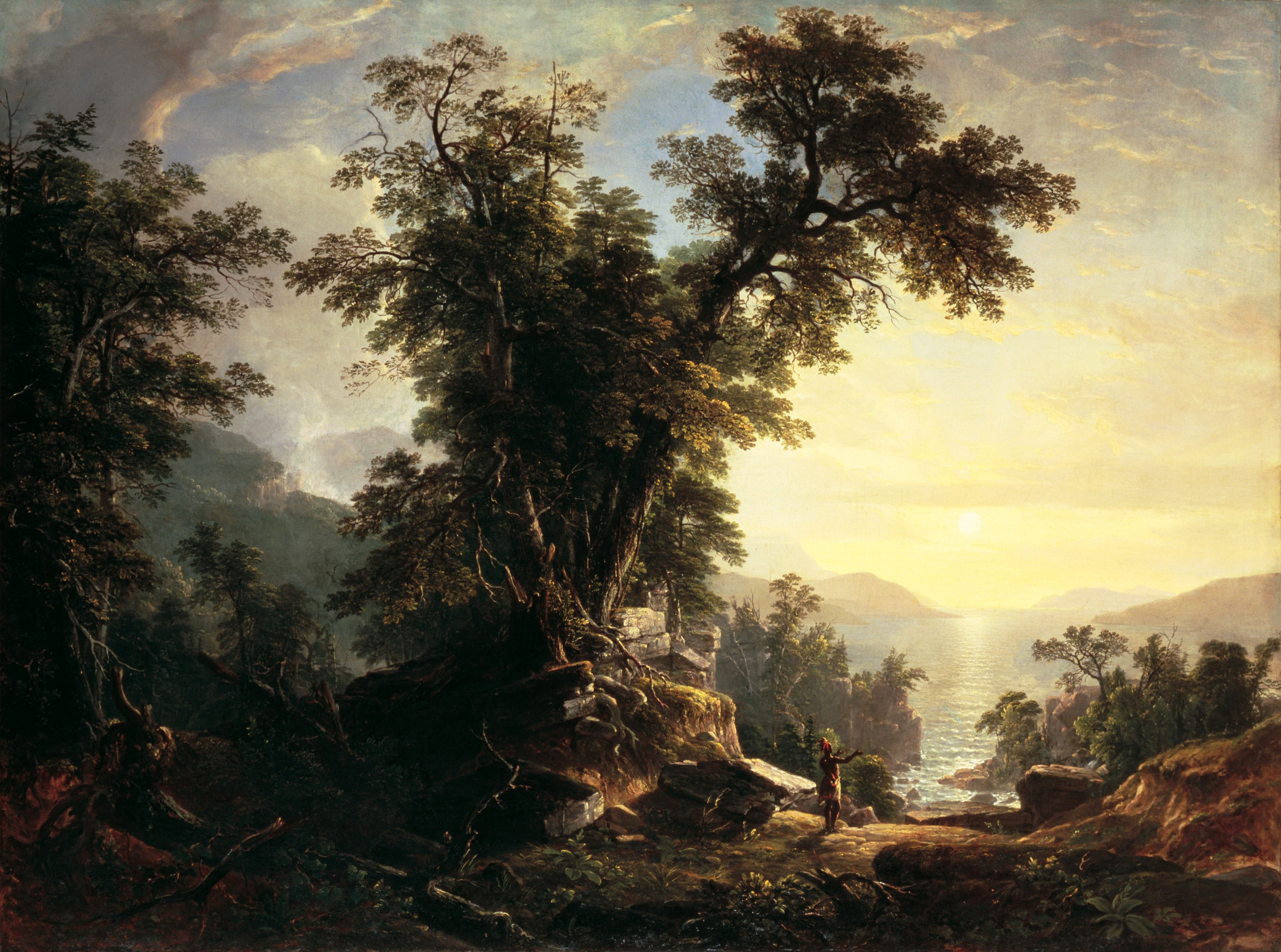
The Indian's Vespers, a portrait by Asher Brown Durand commissioned by the American Art-Union in 1847

The American Art-Union (1839–1851) was a subscription-based organization whose goal was to enlighten and educate an American public to the nation's art, while providing a support system for the viewing and sales of art “executed by artists in the United States or by American artists abroad." Art unions had been popular since the early 19th century in Europe; they first appeared in Switzerland, gaining great popularity in both Germany and the United Kingdom in the 1830s. The British version, Art Union of London (AUL), was a model for the American Art-Union (AAU).

== Description ==
For five dollars a year, the members of the AAU would receive a copy of the minutes from the annual meeting, free admission to the Gallery, at least one original engraving published by the Union from an original piece of art by a contemporary American artist, and in New York City, the members also received a ticket in a lottery to win an original piece of art from within the collection.

=== Impact ===
In its 13 years, the AAU became the largest art union in the United States. It made a significant impact on the art literacy of Americans, developed a taste for an American kind of art, which was largely nationalistic, and supported the custom of artists and museums.

From 1839 until 1851, New York City's population did not reach the 400,000 point, but it is estimated that over three million guests attended the Gallery. The organization grew from 814 subscriptions, in 1840, with art valued at $4,145 to 18,960 subscriptions, valued in excess of $100,000.

=== Possible social causes ===
The American public, providers, and politics combined to produce a rapid rise in AAU's popularity. A growing, literate middle class was keen to pursue scientific, artistic and leisure activities which they had been unable to pursue or afford in the past. A new generation of businessmen wanted to surround themselves with all the appearances and habits of their more wealthy counterparts.

The number of newspapers and periodicals was growing dramatically and the desire for publications with images was preferred. The global popularity of science and art and an interest in “exotic people and places” could be accessed through lectures, subscriptions to special interest groups, or diverse venues such as P. T. Barnum's, Brady's Daguerrean Miniature Gallery and Peale's Gallery of Fine Arts. The business of advertising was in its infancy and the companies could provide consumers with commodities at their own postal box within shrinking delivery schedules due in large to a growing rail system.

The U.S. Congress was promoting westward advancement, communication and Indian resettlement. Further, emigrants from the plains were pushing the agenda of Manifest destiny. They became some of the first to help settle what was perceived as America's Manifest destiny.

==== Apollo Gallery ====
In 1838, businessman James V. Herring opened the Apollo Gallery in New York City in 1838, to provide a place for American artists to exhibit and sell their art. The Apollo Gallery was the first gallery open at night; from nine a.m. and “every fair evening until nine o’clock” with the use of gas lamps. Around this time, he also received an analysis of the second year experiment from “The Edinburgh Association for the Promotion of Fine Arts in Scotland”. Inspired by it, he encouraged a group of other prominent New York City businessmen to develop the concept using the Apollo Gallery as their venue for America's first art union. Although the concept was very popular, it was not sufficient to remunerate Herring. However, he would stay active with the group, becoming the first Corresponding Secretary on the Committee of Management and the only artist.

== Creation ==
A new venue and a new name—the American Art-Union—set itself a double task within its Charter, dated May 7, 1840. The first was a moral task of developing the taste of the middling classes towards what was in the AAU's estimation the best kind of American art and its themes. The second, was to provide a venue for the exhibition and sale of art from contemporary and emerging American artists within its “Perpetual Free Gallery” (free to members, nominal charge to non-members).

The AAU's management were among the wealthiest, (six of the ten most wealthy in the city), most conservative and well connected men in New York City. They were mostly first or at most second generation wealth and had close ties in business, politics and social endeavors. There were only five presidents in the thirteen years and of the 211 possible choices of individuals for office, the duties were performed by eighty-two.

The Committee of Management in 1839 was: John W. Francis, M.D., President, Philip Hone, (banker, politician, etc.), J. Watson Webb (newspaper editor), John P. Ridner (mahogany merchant), John L. Morton (merchant?), Augustus Greele (paper merchant), James W. Gerard (lawyer, philanthropist), William L. Morris (lawyer), William Kemble (merchant), T. N. Campbell (broker), Aaron R. Thompson (merchant), George Bruce (typefounder), Duncan C. Pell (auctioneer), Eleazar Parmly (dentist), F. W. Edmonds (Cashier of the L. M. Bank), Treasurer, Benjamin Nathan (broker), Recording Secretary, James Herring (gallery proprietor), Corresponding Secretary.

From a patriarchal position, the Committee deemed itself best able to choose the artists, select the art work that would be chosen as part of the AAU's permanent collection and choose the pieces or pieces to be engraved and published. Further, as “merchant amateurs” they would be the best suited to manage the Art-Union, “just like a good merchant”. Their goal was “to establish a National School of Art,” one which was originally American—illustrative of American scenery and American manners”.

Artists (in part): George Caleb Bingham, Thomas Cole, Jasper Francis Cropsey, Ferdinand Raab, Francis D’Avignon, Thomas Doney, Asher Brown Durand, Daniel Huntington, John Frederick Kensett, Emanuel Gottlieb Leutze, William Sidney Mount, James Smillie, Richard Caton Woodville.

Although there were other art unions in the United States, “None would achieve the popularity or influence of the American Art-Union." (Myers:41) The art union concept, however, ultimately fell out of favor. A number of reasons have been given for the AAU's demise, including the lottery and other managerial weaknesses and competition.

AAU was reflective of "high brow" art and artists of the day. Their choices informed a new audience of art aficionados. As the country endeavored to define its values and mission in the mid-19th century, AAU codified and defined the Art of America as "Proud, defiant, confident, and quintessentially American." These character qualities were required in the landscapes, the genre painting and the historical imagery if they were to be chosen by the AAU.

Examples included Emanuel Leutze, who painted Westward the Course of Empire Takes Its Way to emphasize the vastness of possibilities in the American future. Washington Crossing the Delaware, a portrait of George Washington's covert crossing of the Delaware River during the American Revokutionary War, inspired reformers in Europe. George Caleb Bingham reflect the tension of the unknown and the excitement of the West in The Concealed Enemy (1845), and he captured the independent and optimistic spirit in his The Jolly Flatboatmen (1846). Thomas Cole's Arcadia and Youth lent a comforting and moralizing tone to landscapes that inspired two generations of artists, including his student Frederic Edwin Church, who had a lasting affiliation with the AAU.

== Downfall ==
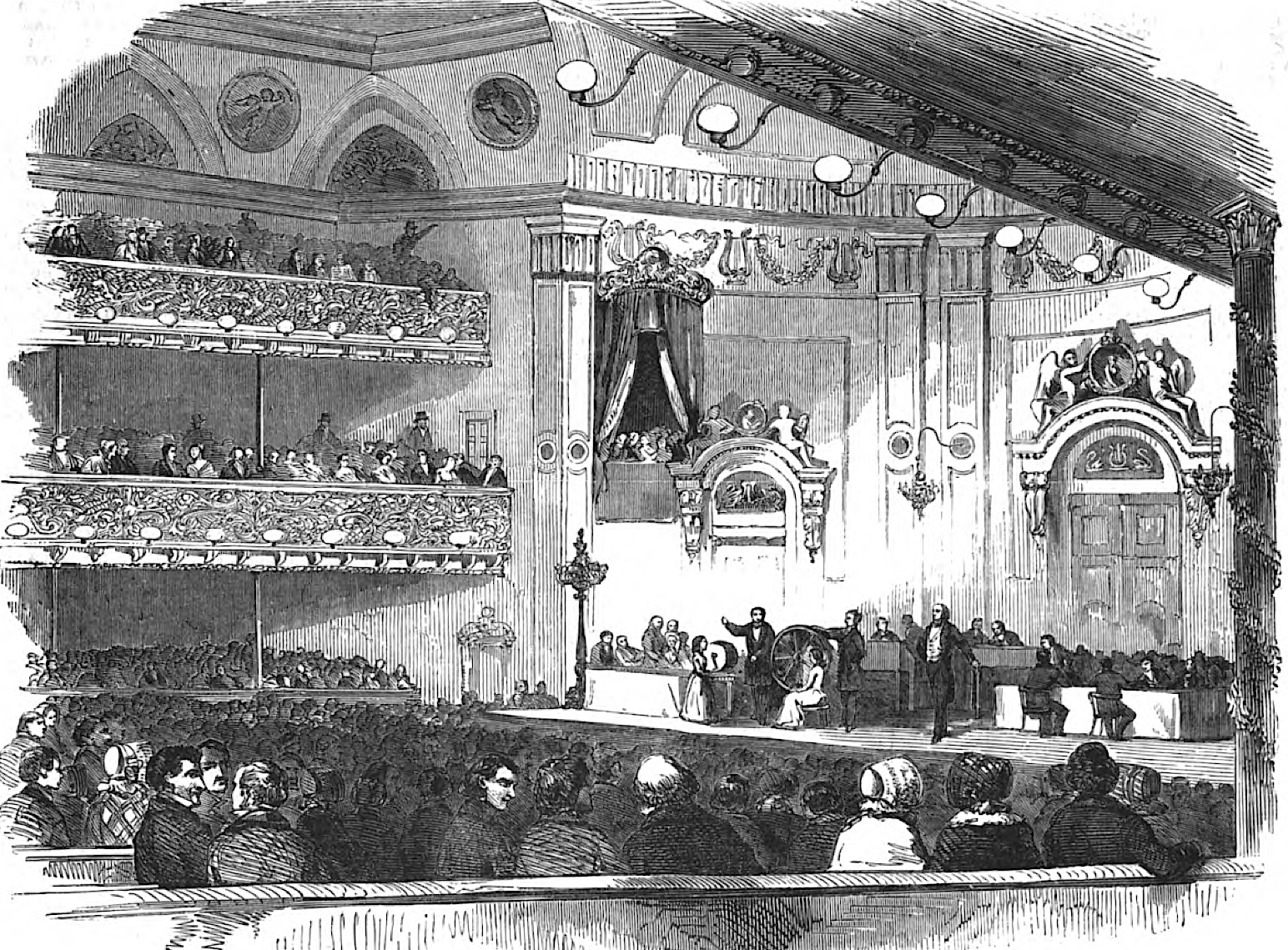
The last distribution of prizes by lot in 1850

Many members would not buy their subscriptions until the collection had art "worth winning", but the AAU could not pay for the art, some of which was purchased on credit, without the funds from the subscriptions. The 1851 distribution, scheduled for December 31, was indefinitely postponed one day before, for this reason.

One artist, Thomas Whitley, whose work was not accepted by the AAU, expressed his complaints to the New York Herald. The editor, James Gordon Bennett, himself a subscriber, accused the management of misuse of funds. (Baker:144) In June 1852, a New York court ruled the lottery to be illegal under New York law, and in October, the state's highest court agreed. The management responded in a letter to the editor of The New York Times.

A petition was made to the New York State Assembly to investigate the conduct of the AAU's affairs; a committee was appointed and took testimony for several days in the summer of 1853. Its report said, "accounts were kept and managed in a loose and unsatisfactory manner". In addition, a five per cent building fund was considered to have impaired the liquidity of the Union.

In an open letter to New York Assembly, published in The New York Times, AAU's president reported that the management "felt deeply injured...the extensive circulation of engraved copies... of American genius [afforded] the surest means for educating the public taste...thus keeping alive and extending a knowledge of the progress and condition of the arts". All of the art in their collection was sold at auction on December 15–17, 1852.

History supported the AAU's choices. Many of the paintings are hanging in the halls of the United States Congress, the White House, the Metropolitan Museum of Art, and the Museum of Fine Arts in Boston. (Sperling.)

== Sources ==
- Baker, Charles E. "The American Art-Union" in Cowdrey, Mary Bartlett (ed.) (1953). American Academy of Fine Arts and American Art-Union, 1816-1852, Vol. 1. New York: New-York Historical Society.
- Cowdrey, Mary Bartlett (ed.) (1953). American Academy of Fine Arts and American Art-Union, Vol. 1: Introduction, 1816-1852. New York: New-York Historical Society.
- Goetzmann, William N. and Goetzmann, William H. (1986). The West of the Imagination. New York: W.W. Norton & Company.
- Mann, Maybelle (1977). The American Art-Union. Washington, D.C.: Collage.
- Myers, Kenneth John (2000) “The Public Display of Art in New York City, 1664-1914” in Dearinger, David B. (ed.). Rave Reviews: American Art and Its Critics, 1826-1925 New York: National Academy of Design.
- Sperling, Joy (Spring, 2002). “Art, Cheap and Good: The Art Union in England and the United States, 1840-60” in Nineteenth-Century Art Worldwide: A Journal of Nineteenth-Century Visual Culture. Spring 2002 (vol 1, issue 1). Retrieved May 9, 2014.
- Trachtenberg, Alan (1989). The Ideology of American Success. Reading American Photographs: Images as History Mathew Brady to Walker Evans. New York: Hill and Wang.
