= Columbus Before the Queen =

Painting by Emanuel Leutze

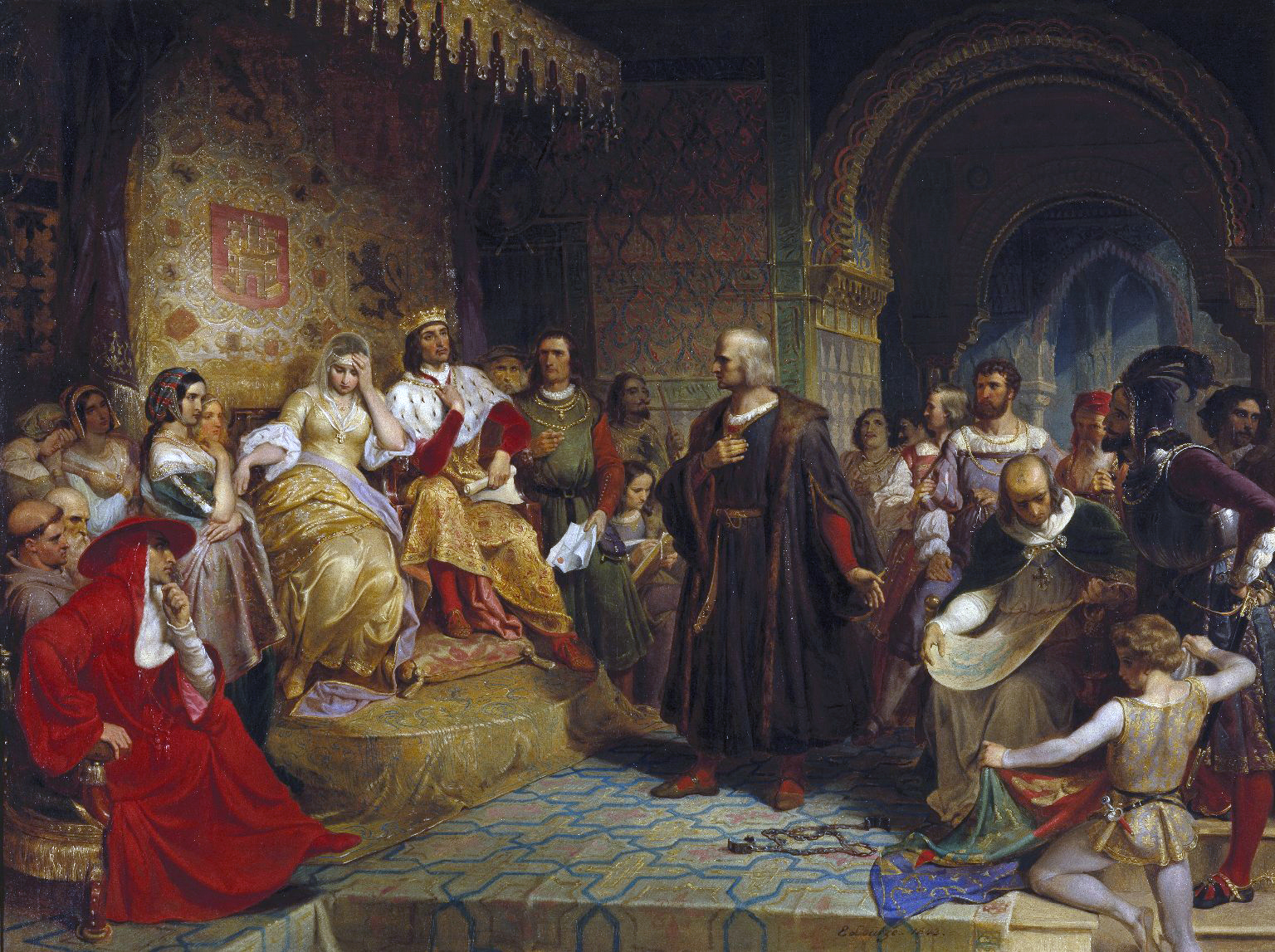
- Artist: Emanuel Leutze
- Year: 1843
- Medium: Oil on canvas
- Dimensions: 97.9 cm × 129.4 cm (38.5 in × 50.9 in)
- Location: Brooklyn Museum, New York

Columbus Before the Queen is an oil-on-canvas painting by German-American painter Emanuel Leutze. It is signed, and dated 1843. It is in the collection of the Brooklyn Museum, in New York, US.

== Description ==
The painting is typical of the historical genre cultivated by Leutze. Leutze executed six treatments related to Christopher Columbus; this was the third. The Genoese navigator is at the center of the composition, set at the Spanish court, where he addresses the Catholic Monarchs, Isabella of Castile and Ferdinand II of Aragon, both enthroned, while trying to convince them to support his plan to reach India by travelling west. The queen looks away, with a hand on her head, seemingly distraught, while the king addresses Columbus. The set seems Moorish, possibly relating to the recent conquest of the Kingdom of Granada in 1492. Several male and female courtiers are present, while a monk unveils a nautical chart in support of Columbus project. A cardinal in a red hat is seated at the left corner, and seems to be listening attentively to Columbus.
