= Pietro Giovanni Leonori =

Italian painter

Pietro Giovanni Leonori (active 1400) was an Italian painter of the Bolognese school. Leonori painted Madonna & Saints in the Custom's House, and decorated several public buildings with frescoes.
