= Westward the Course of Empire Takes Its Way =

Painting by Emanuel Leutze

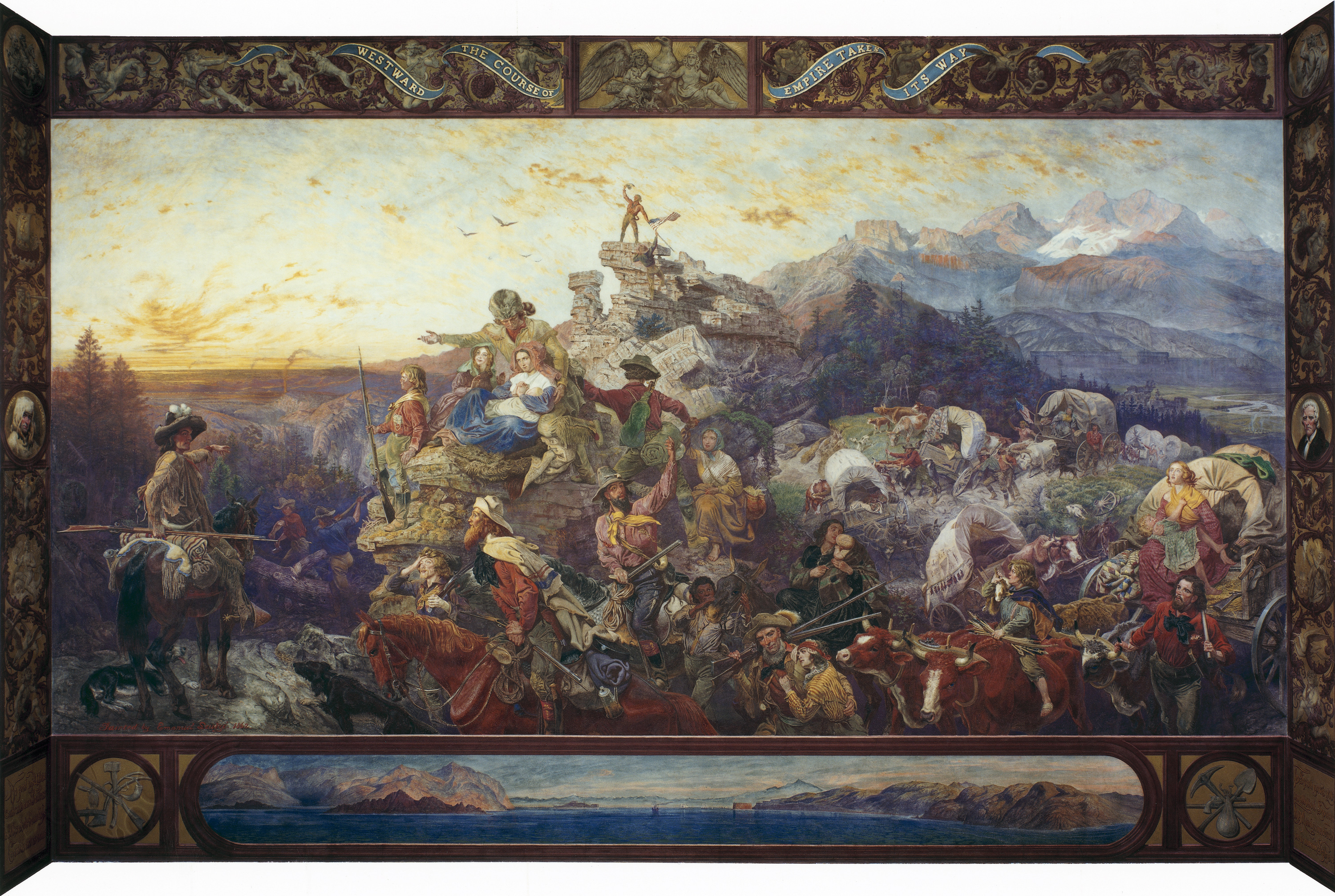
- Artist: Emanuel Leutze
- Year: 1861
- Dimensions: 142 m × 193 m (20 ft × 30 ft)
- Location: United States Capitol; Washington, D.C.
- Owner: Architect of the Capitol

Westward the Course of Empire Takes Its Way (study)
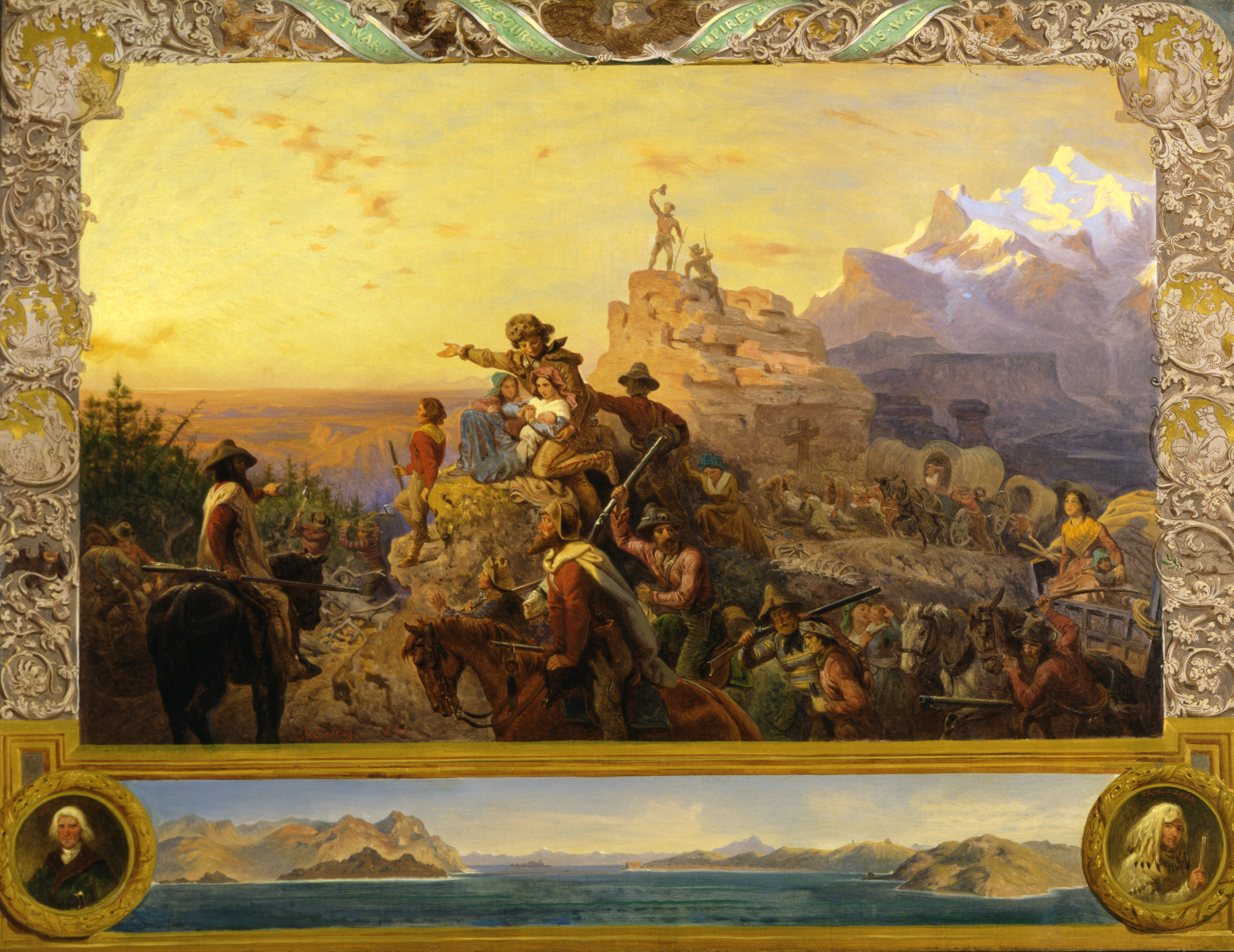
- Artist: Emanuel Leutze
- Year: 1861
- Dimensions: 84.5 cm × 110.1 cm (33 1/4 in × 43 3/8 in)
- Location: Smithsonian American Art Museum; Washington, D.C.
- Owner: Smithsonian Institution

Westward the Course of Empire Takes Its Way (also known as Westward Ho) is a 20-by-30-foot (6.1 m × 9.1 m) painted mural displayed behind the western staircase of the House of Representatives chamber in the United States Capitol Building. The mural was painted by Emanuel Gottlieb Leutze in 1861 and symbolizes Manifest Destiny, the belief that the United States was destined for Western exploration and expansion originating from the initial colonies along the Atlantic seaboard to the Pacific Ocean. A study measuring 33 1/4 by 43 3/8 inches (84.5 cm × 110.2 cm) hangs in the Smithsonian American Art Museum.

== Content ==
Leutze combined pioneer men and women, mountain guides, wagons, and mules to suggest a divinely ordained pilgrimage to the Promised Land of the western frontier. Within the left half of the picture is a depiction of the entrance to the San Francisco Bay, the Golden Gate, which is being pointed to by the pilgrim seated atop the rock in the foreground. Within the right hemisphere of the painting is a depiction of a valley, representing the Valley of Darkness and symbolic of the troubles faced by explorers. The imagery is familiar imperial iconography and is regarded as a symbol of American exceptionalism and the realization of Manifest Destiny, ultimately leading to the evolution of the American Empire.

== Literary reference ==
The painting takes its inspiration from the closing lines of George Berkeley's Verses on the Prospect of Planting Arts and Learning in America:

Westward the course of empire takes its way;
The first four Acts already past,
A fifth shall close the Drama with the day;
Time's noblest offspring is the last.

== Influences ==
The imagery of the pilgrim gesturing on a high rock is very similar to the 5 cent postage stamp, Fremont in the Rocky Mountains, that was part of the 1898 Trans-Mississippi Issue and reprinted a century later.

A Currier and Ives print from 1868 uses the same title and theme for a very different print, showing a railroad crossing a new settlement as the train goes west.

A photographic print and a stereograph by Alexander Gardner, both of an 1867 end-of-track frontier construction train, were titled Westward The Course of Empire Takes Its Way.

== In popular culture ==
David Foster Wallace named one of his novellas "Westward the Course of Empire Takes Its Way" in his 1989 collection Girl with Curious Hair.

Early revisions of the 1995 computer game Oregon Trail II depict the study version of this painting on the title screen.

The painting is seen in the 2013 video game BioShock Infinite.
