= Emanuel Leutze =

German-American painter (1816-1868)

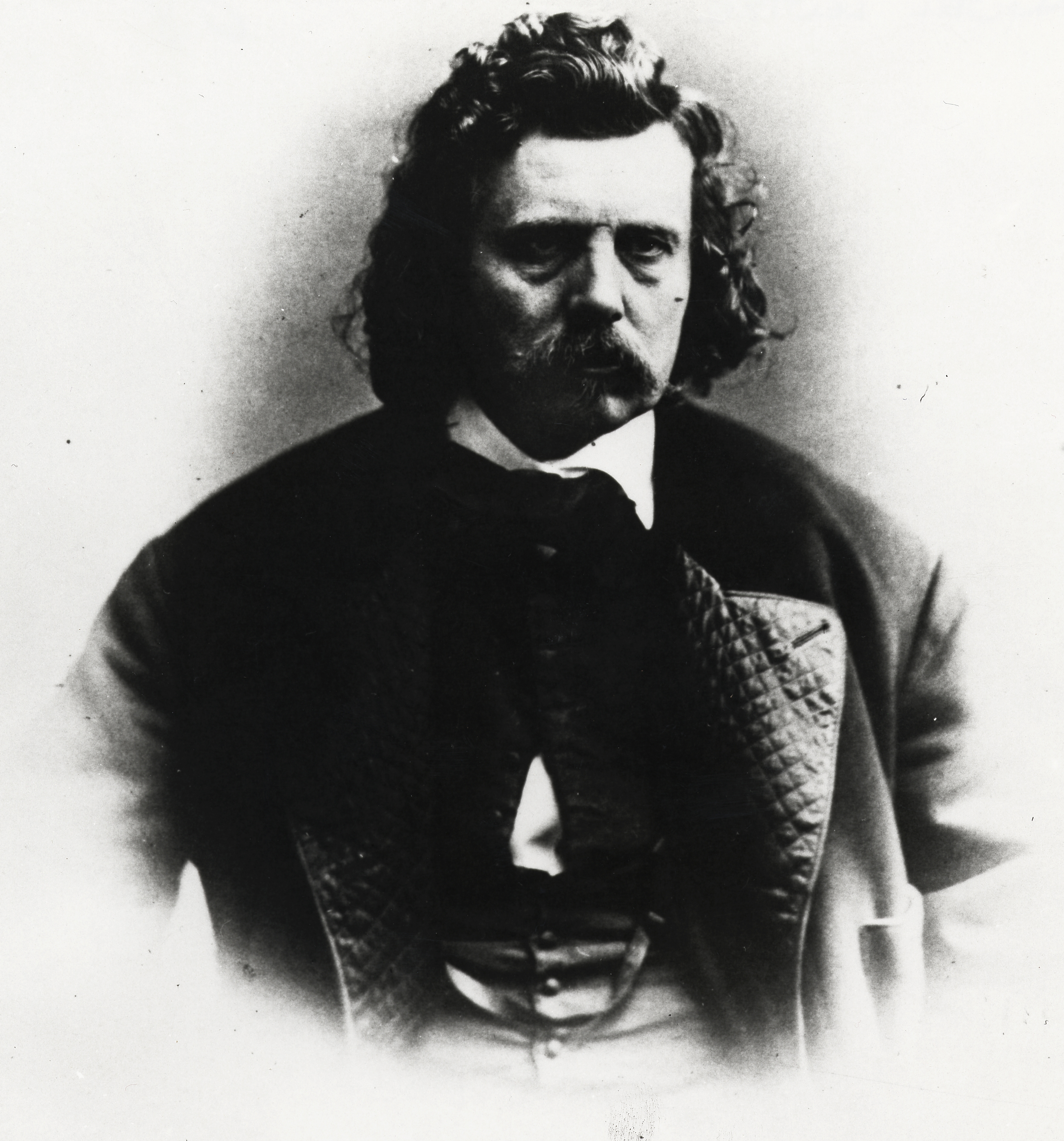
- Emanuel Leutze
- Born: May 24, 1816; Schwäbisch Gmünd, Kingdom of Württemberg
- Died: July 18, 1868 (aged 52); Washington, D.C., U.S.
- Resting place: Glenwood Cemetery; Washington, D.C., U.S.
- Education: John Rubens Smith; Karl Friedrich Lessing
- Known for: History painter
- Notable work: Washington Crossing the Delaware
- Spouse: Julianne Lottner (m. 1845)

Signature
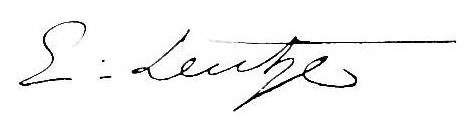

Emanuel Gottlieb Leutze (May 24, 1816 – July 18, 1868) was a German-born American history painter, best known for his 1851 painting Washington Crossing the Delaware. He is associated with the Düsseldorf school of painting.

== Biography ==
Leutze was born in Schwäbisch Gmünd, Kingdom of Württemberg. He was brought to the United States as a child in 1825. His parents settled first in Fredericksburg, Virginia, and then at Philadelphia. The first development of his artistic talent occurred while he was attending the sickbed of his father, when he attempted drawing to occupy the long hours of waiting. His father died in 1831. At 14, he was painting portraits for $5 apiece. Through such work, he supported himself after the death of his father. In 1834, he received his first instruction in art at the classes of John Rubens Smith, a portrait painter in Philadelphia. He soon became skilled, and promoted a plan for publishing, in Washington, portraits of eminent American statesmen; however, he was met with slight encouragement.

=== Europe ===
In 1840, one of his paintings attracted attention and gave him several orders, which enabled him to attend the Kunstakademie Düsseldorf in his native Germany. Due to his anti-academic attitude, he studied only one year at the academy, in the class of Director Schadow. Leutze was mostly influenced by the painter Karl Friedrich Lessing. In 1842, he went to Munich, studying the works of Cornelius and Kaulbach, and, while there, finished his Columbus before the Queen. The following year he visited Venice and Rome, making studies from Titian and Michelangelo. His first work, Columbus before the Council of Salamanca (1841) was purchased by the Düsseldorf Art Union. A companion picture, Columbus in Chains, procured him the gold medal of the Brussels Art Exhibition, and was subsequently purchased by the Art Union in New York; it was the basis of the 1893 $2 Columbian Issue stamp. In 1845, after a tour in Italy, he returned to Düsseldorf, marrying Juliane Lottner and making his home there for 14 years.

During his years in Düsseldorf, he was a resource for visiting Americans: he found them places to live and work, provided introductions, and gave them emotional and even financial support. For many years, he was the president of the Düsseldorf Artists' Association; in 1848, he was an early promoter of the "Malkasten" art association; and in 1857, he led the call for a gathering of artists which originated the founding of the Allgemeine deutsche Kunstgenossenschaft. A strong supporter of Europe's Revolutions of 1848, Leutze decided to paint an image that would encourage Europe's liberal reformers with the example of the American Revolution. Using American tourists and art students as models and assistants, Leutze finished a first version of Washington Crossing the Delaware in 1850. Just after it was completed, the first version was damaged by fire in his studio, subsequently restored, and acquired by the Kunsthalle Bremen. On September 5, 1942, during World War II, it was destroyed in a bombing raid by the Allied forces. The second painting, a replica of the first, only larger, was ordered in 1850 by the Parisian art trader Adolphe Goupil for his New York branch and placed on exhibition on Broadway in October 1851. It is now owned by the Metropolitan Museum of Art in New York. In 1854, Leutze finished his depiction of the Battle of Monmouth, "Washington rallying the troops at Monmouth", commissioned by an important patron, the banker David Leavitt of New York City and Great Barrington, Massachusetts.

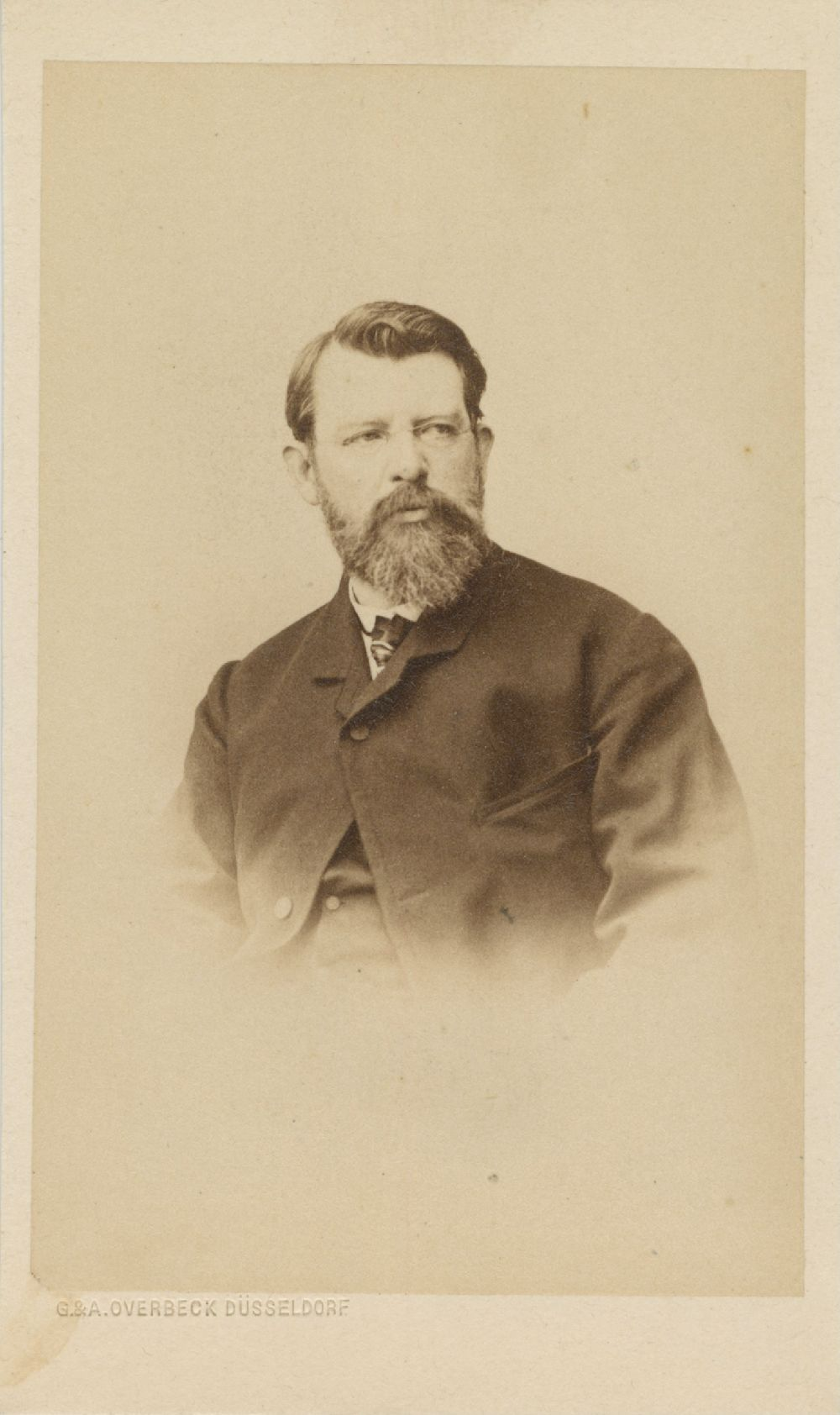
Emanuel Leutze by G. & A. Overbeck (firm), c. 1868

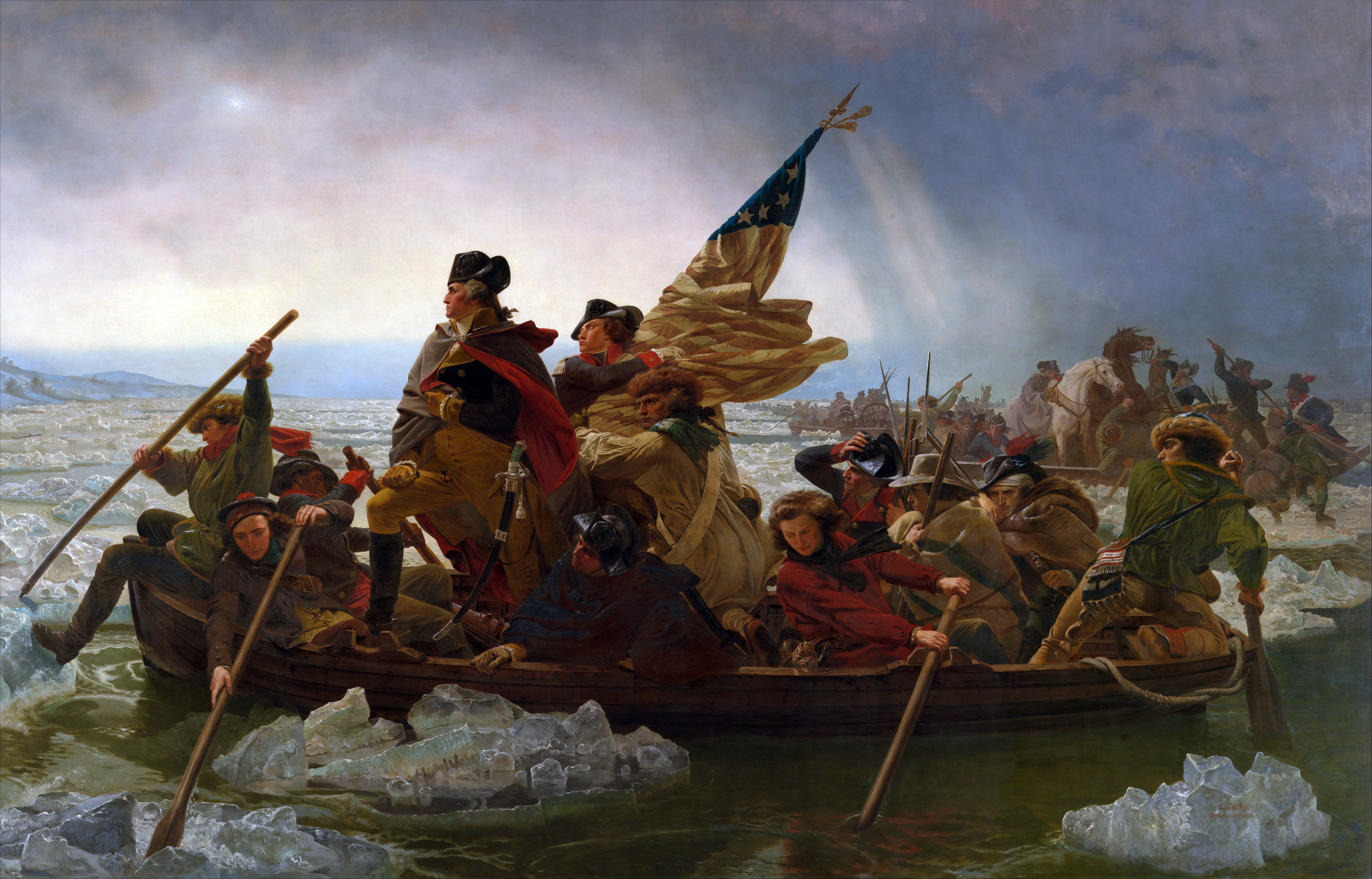
Washington Crossing the Delaware (1851) (Note: According to one art critic, minor historical inaccuracies in Leutze's painting include the Betsy Ross flag, which was created about one year after the event; soldiers used a different type of boat for the crossing; and Washington is depicted older than he was at the time of the crossing at age 44. The soldiers' uniforms are accurately depicted, and the painting correctly conveys colonial unity and pride. The official United States flag was adopted by Congress on June 14, 1777.)

=== New York City and Washington, D.C. ===
In 1859, Leutze returned to the United States and opened a studio in New York City. He divided his time between New York City and Washington, D.C. In 1859, he painted a portrait of Chief Justice Roger Brooke Taney, which hangs in the Harvard Law School. In a 1992 opinion, Justice Antonin Scalia described the portrait of Taney, made two years after Taney's infamous decision in Dred Scott v. Sandford, as showing Taney "in black, sitting in a shadowed red armchair, left hand resting upon a pad of paper in his lap, right hand hanging limply, almost lifelessly, beside the inner arm of the chair. He sits facing the viewer and staring straight out. There seems to be on his face, and in his deep-set eyes, an expression of profound sadness and disillusionment."

Leutze also executed other portraits, including one of fellow painter William Morris Hunt. That portrait was owned by Hunt's brother Leavitt Hunt, a New York attorney and sometime Vermont resident, and was shown at an exhibition devoted to William Morris Hunt's work at the Museum of Fine Arts, Boston in 1878.

In 1860, Leutze was commissioned by the U.S. Congress to decorate a stairway in the Capitol Building in Washington, DC, for which he painted a large composition, Westward the Course of Empire Takes Its Way, which is also commonly known as Westward Ho!.

Late in life, he became a member of the National Academy of Design. He was also a member of the Union League Club of New York, which has a number of his paintings. At age 52, he died in Washington, D.C. of heat stroke. He was interred at Glenwood Cemetery. At the time of his death, a painting, The Emancipation of the Slaves, was in preparation.

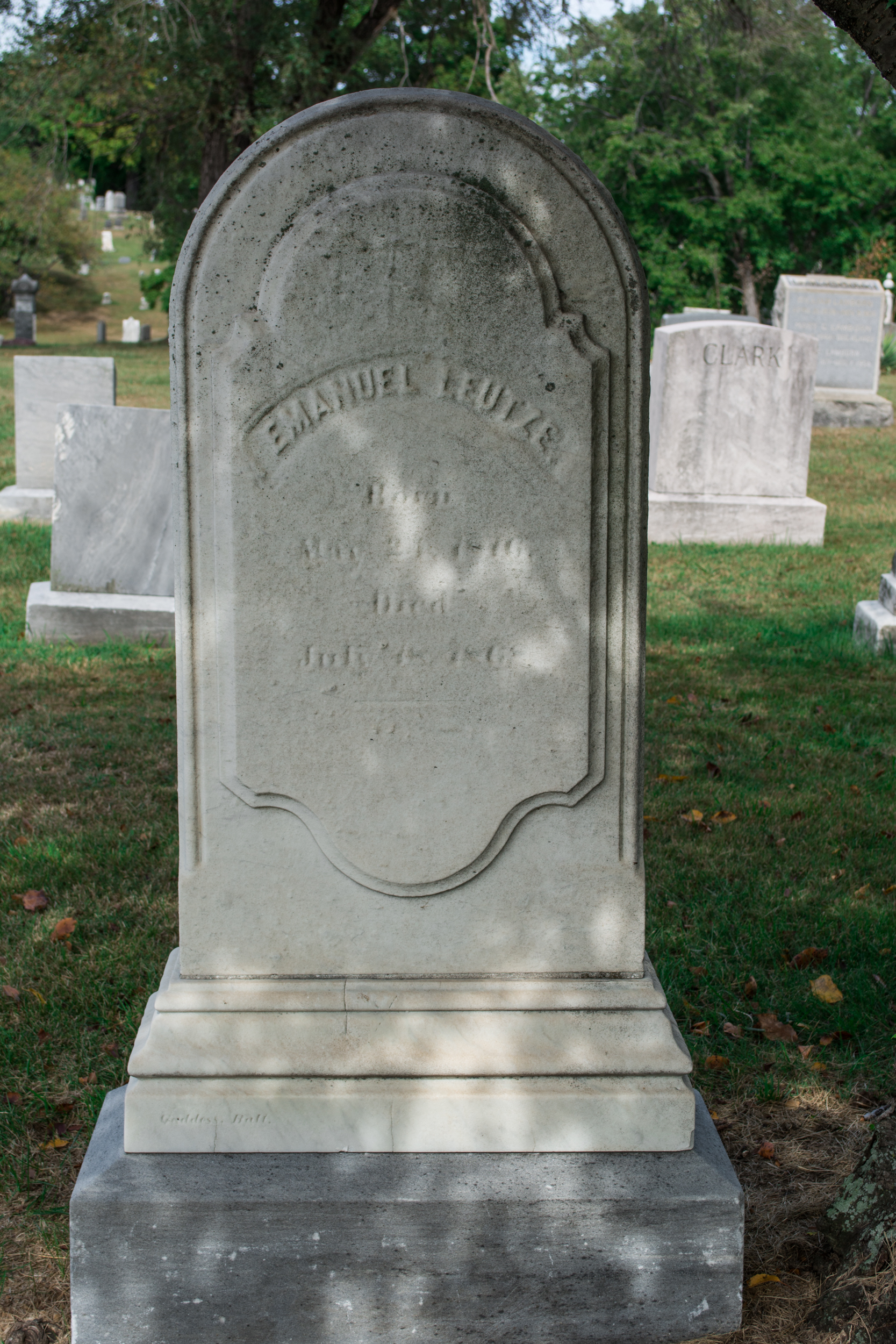
Grave of Emanuel Leutze at Glenwood Cemetery.

Leutze's portraits are known for the artistic quality of their patriotic romanticism, and his epic Washington Crossing the Delaware ranks in the utmost echelon of American national iconography.

== Gallery of works ==
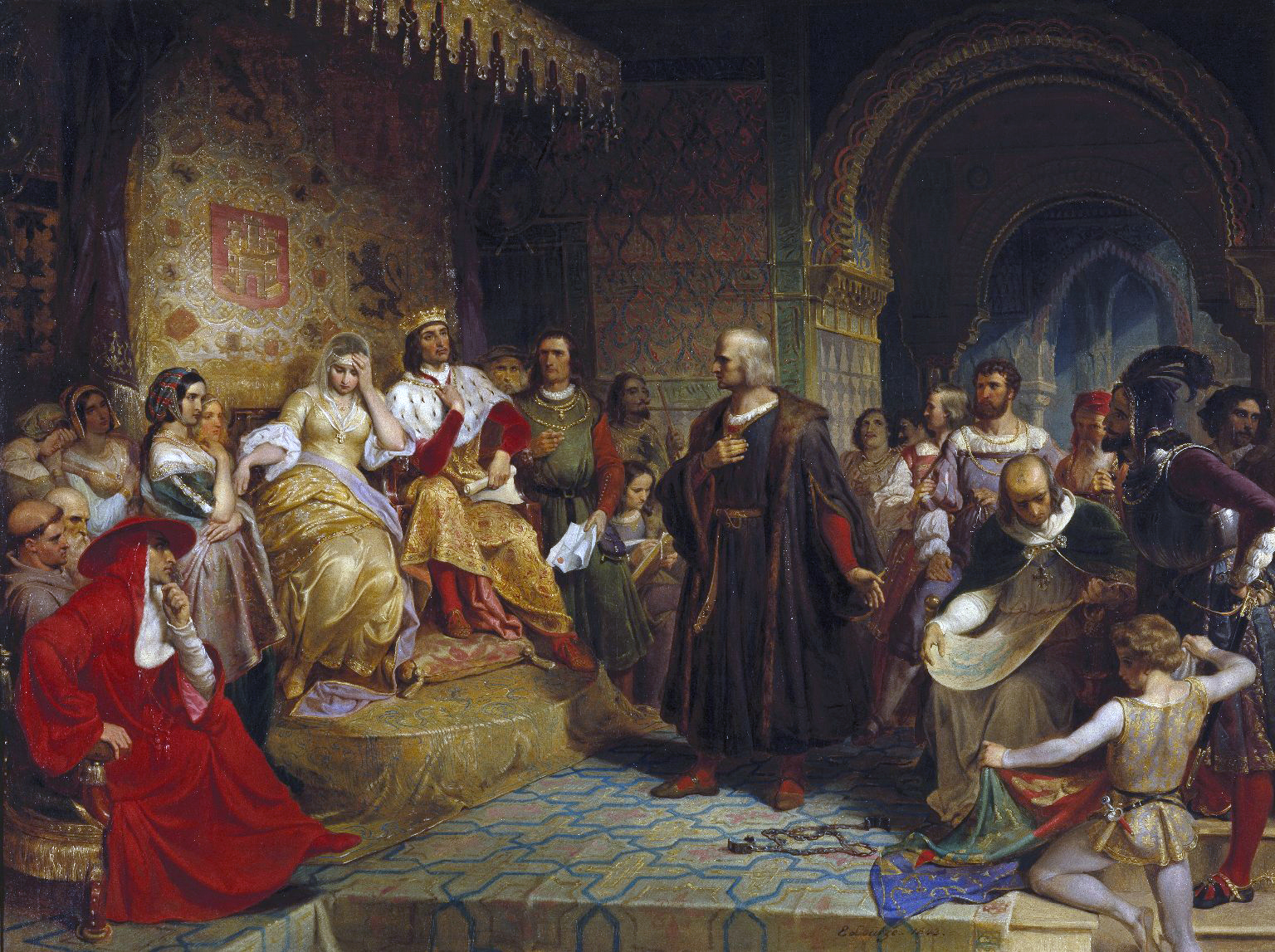
Columbus Before the Queen (1843)

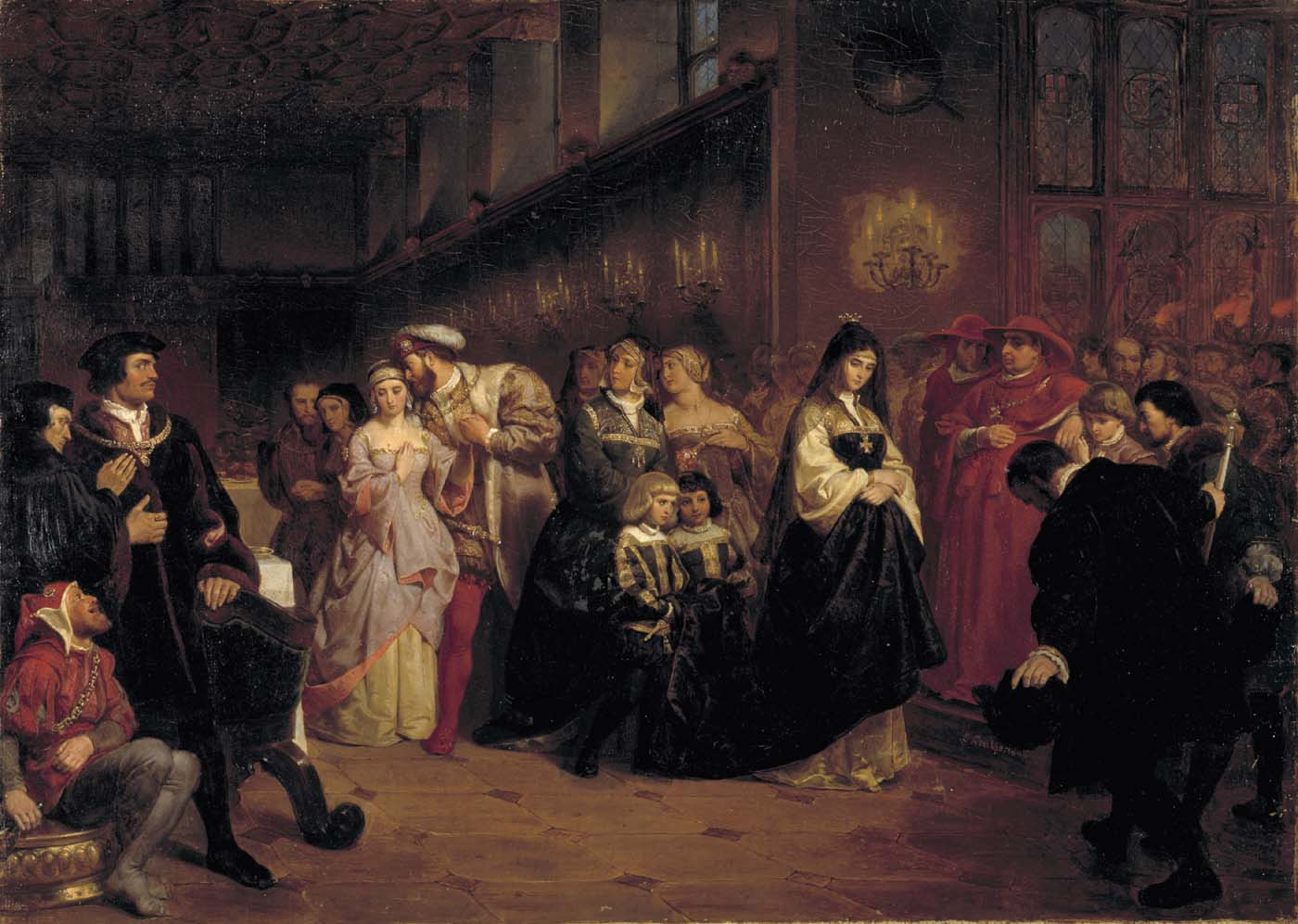
The Courtship of Anne Boleyn (1846)

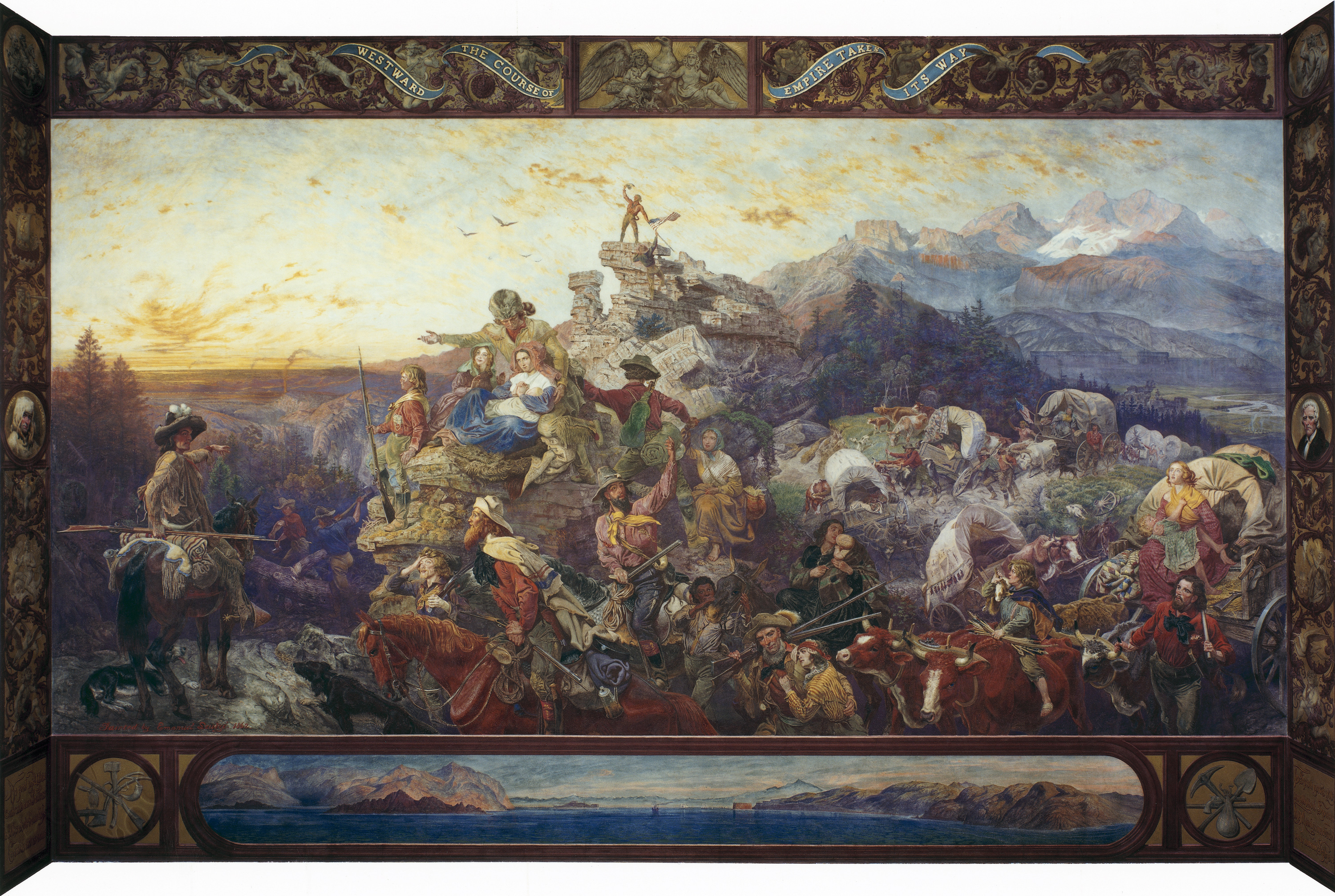
Westward the Course of Empire Takes Its Way (1860)

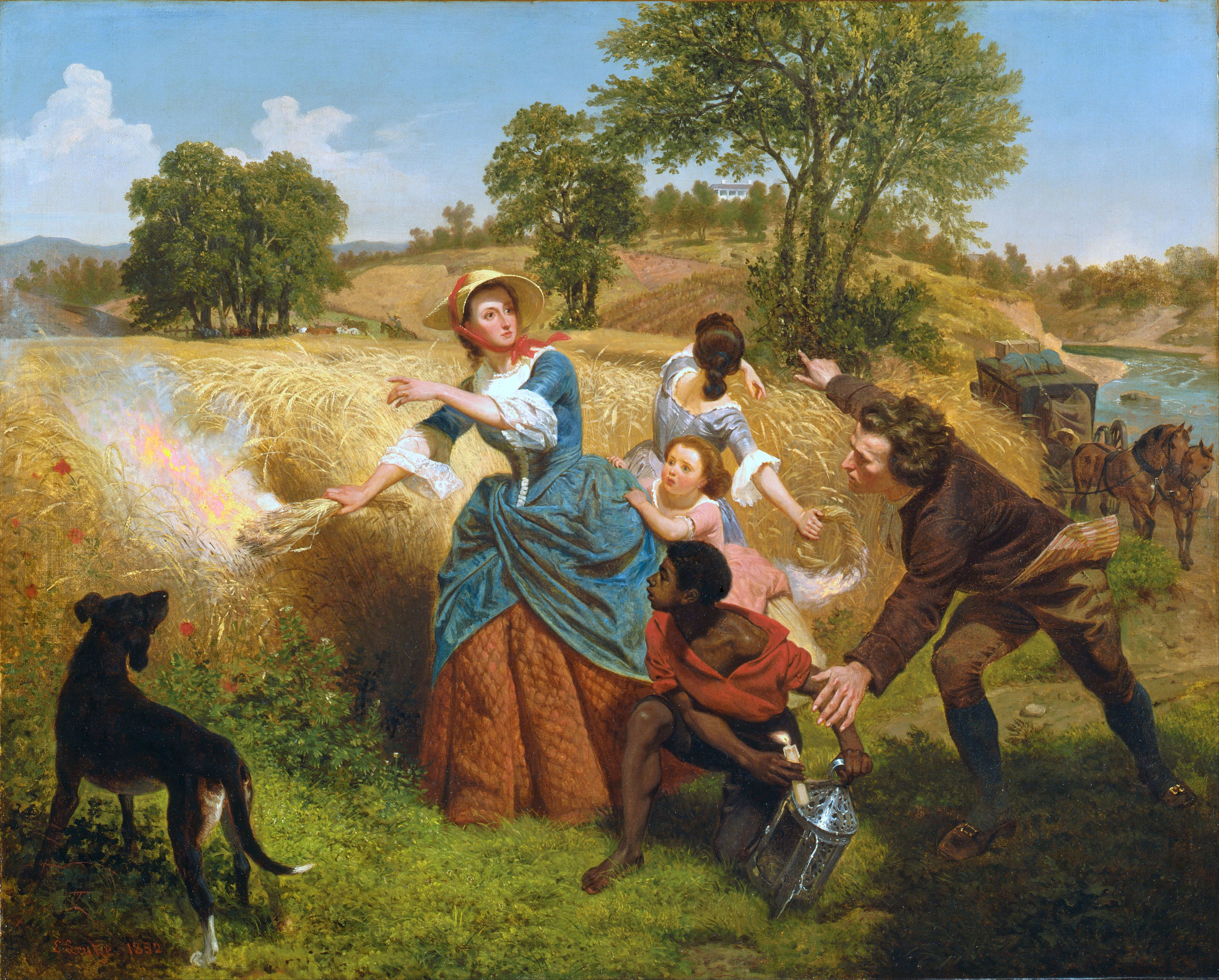
Mrs. Schuyler Burning Her Wheat Fields on the Approach of the British (1852)

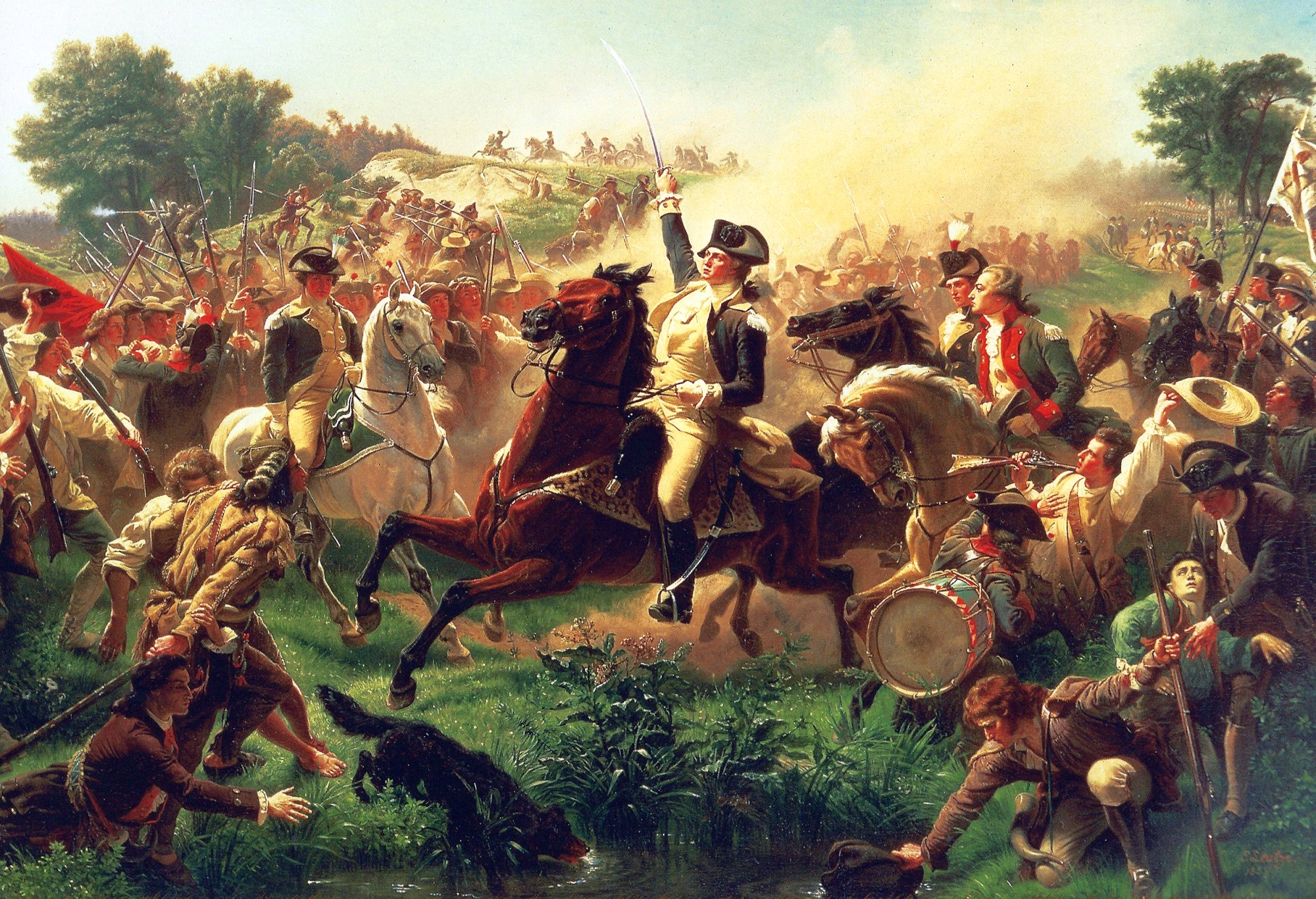
Washington Rallying the Troops at Monmouth (c. 1851–1854)

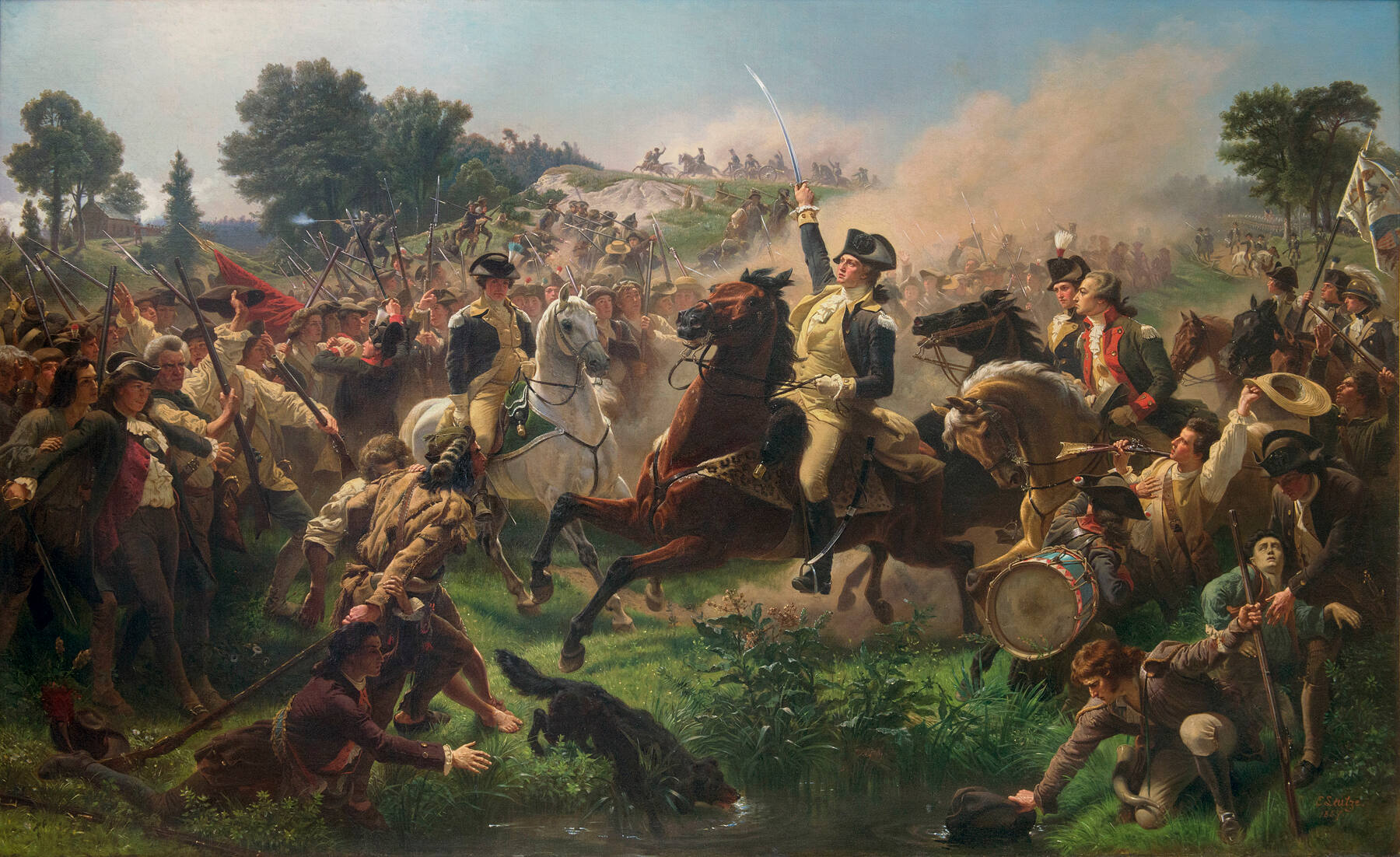
Washington Rallying the Troops at Monmouth (1857)

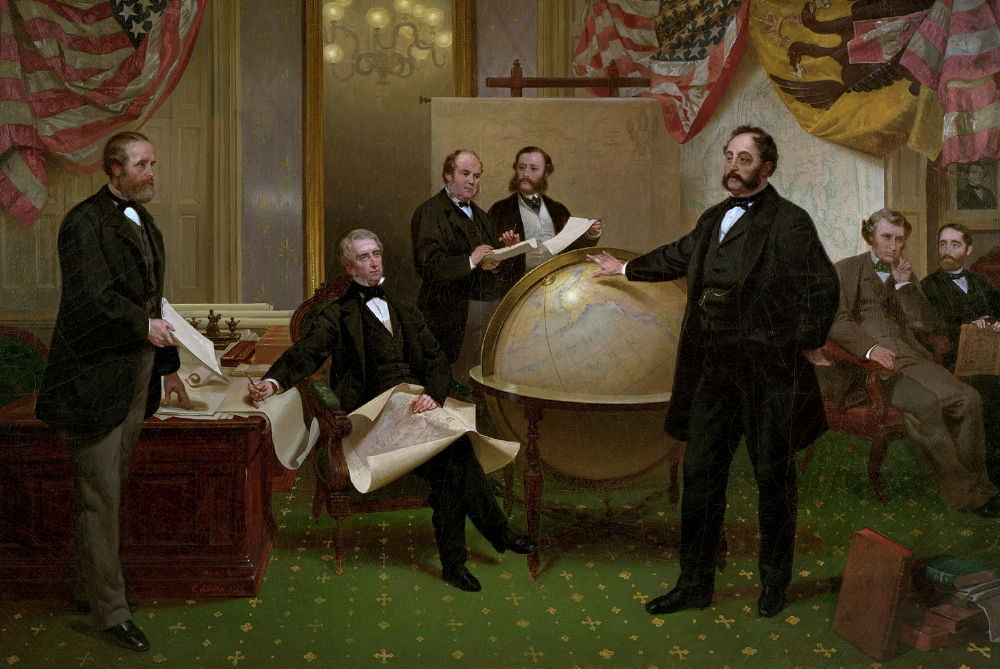
Signing of the Alaska treaty (1867)

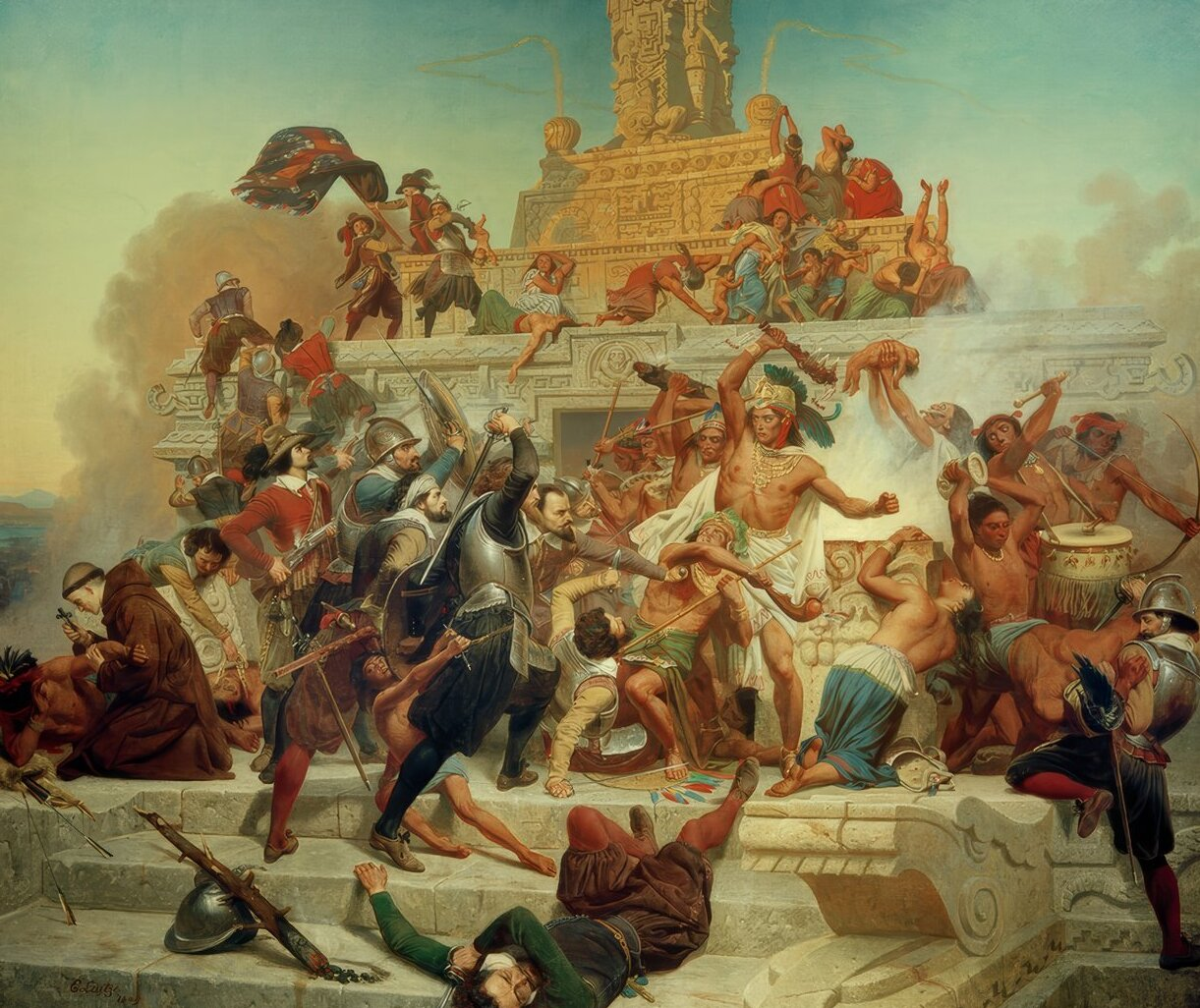
The Storming of the Teocalli by Cortez and His Troops (1848)

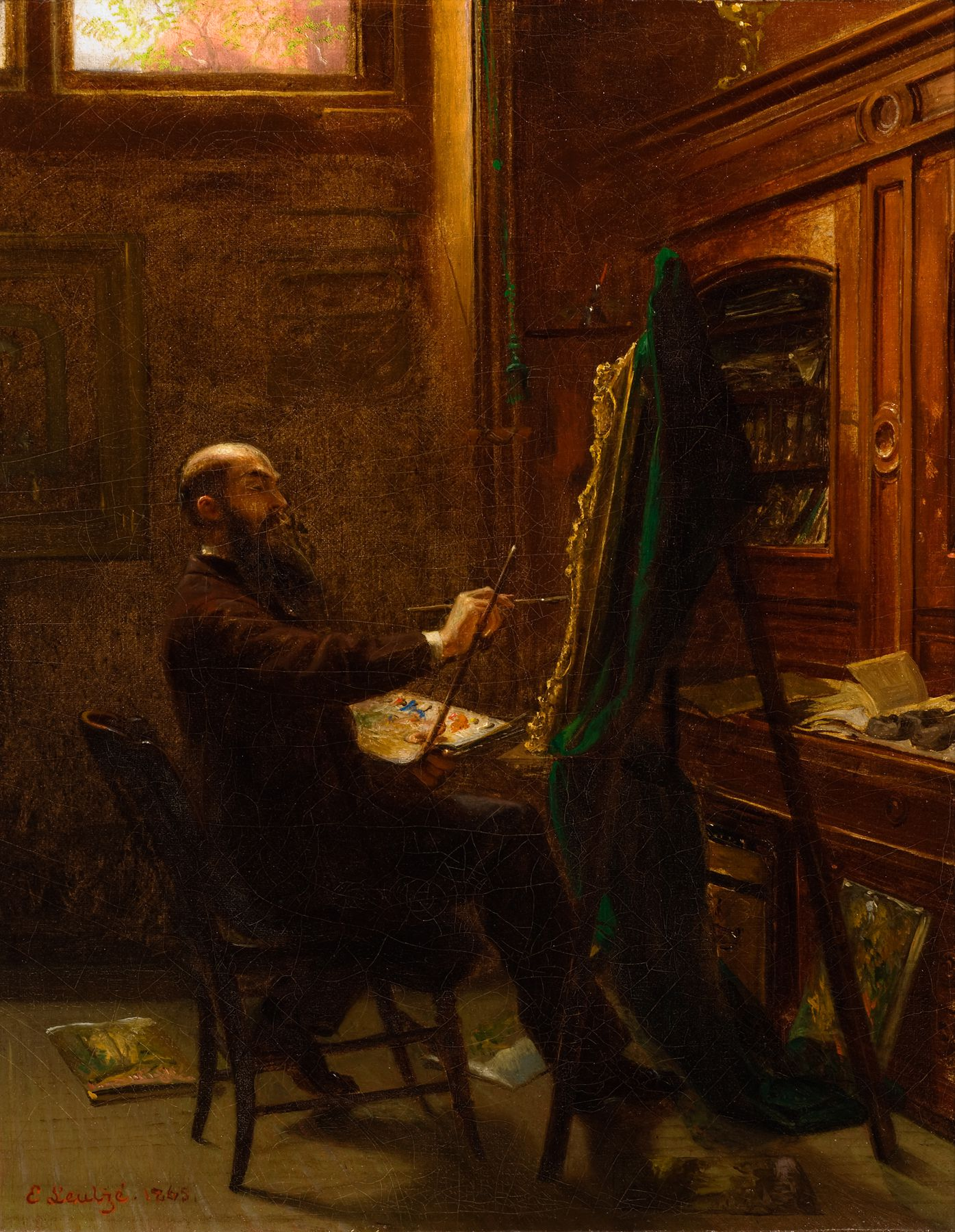
Worthington Whittredge in His Tenth Street Studio (1865)

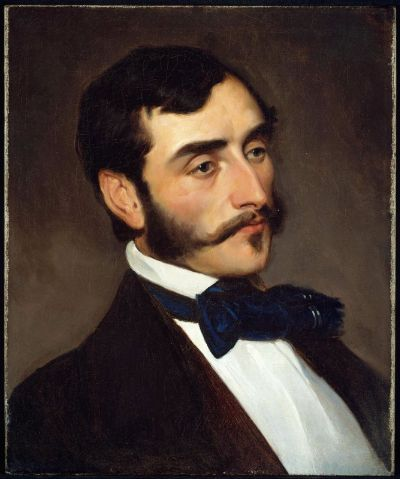
Portrait of William Morris Hunt (ca. 1845)

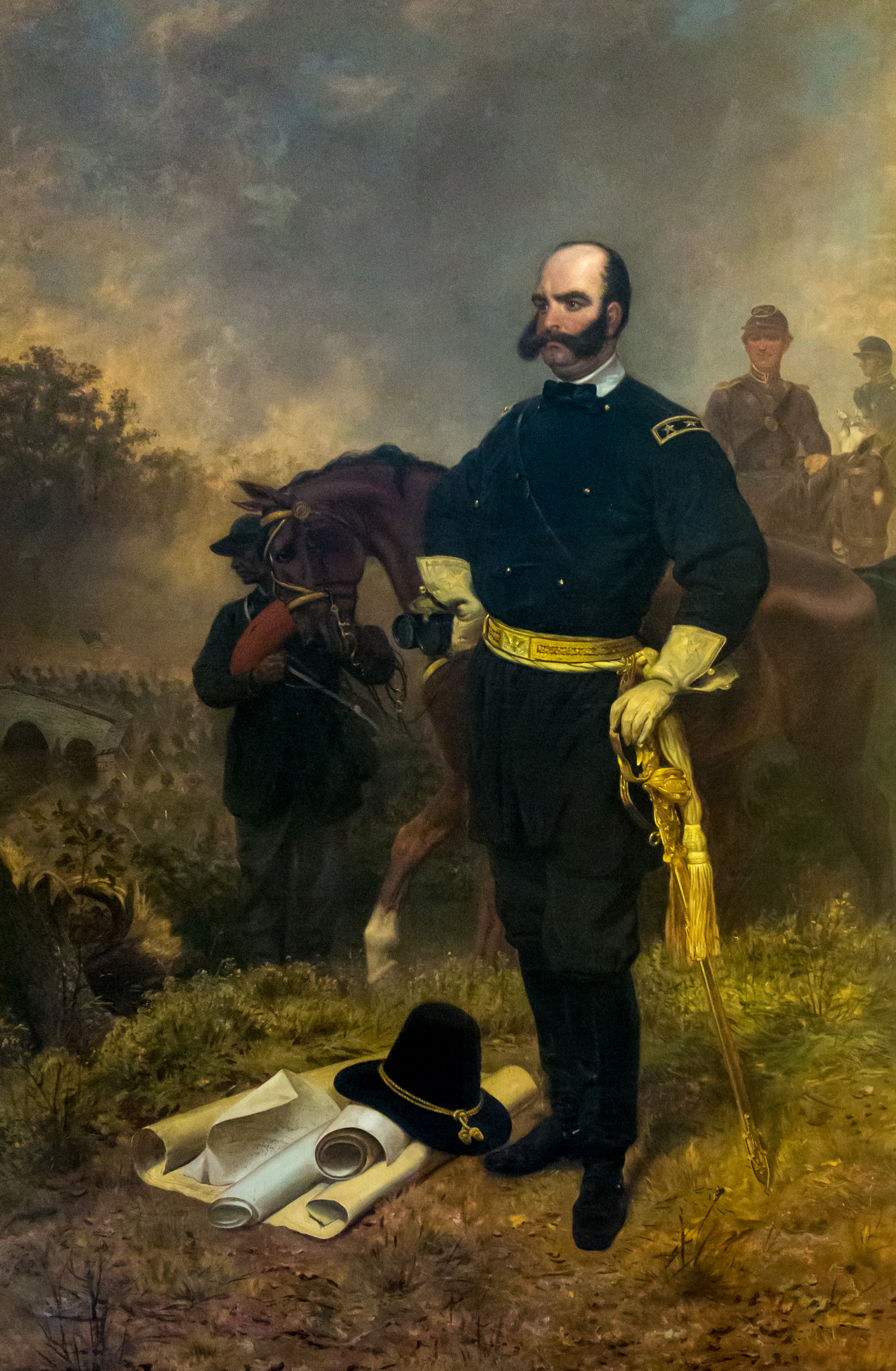
General Ambrose Burnside at Antietam (1863)

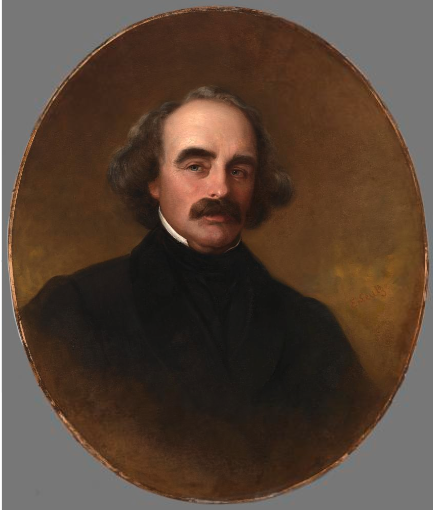
Nathaniel Hawthorne (1862)

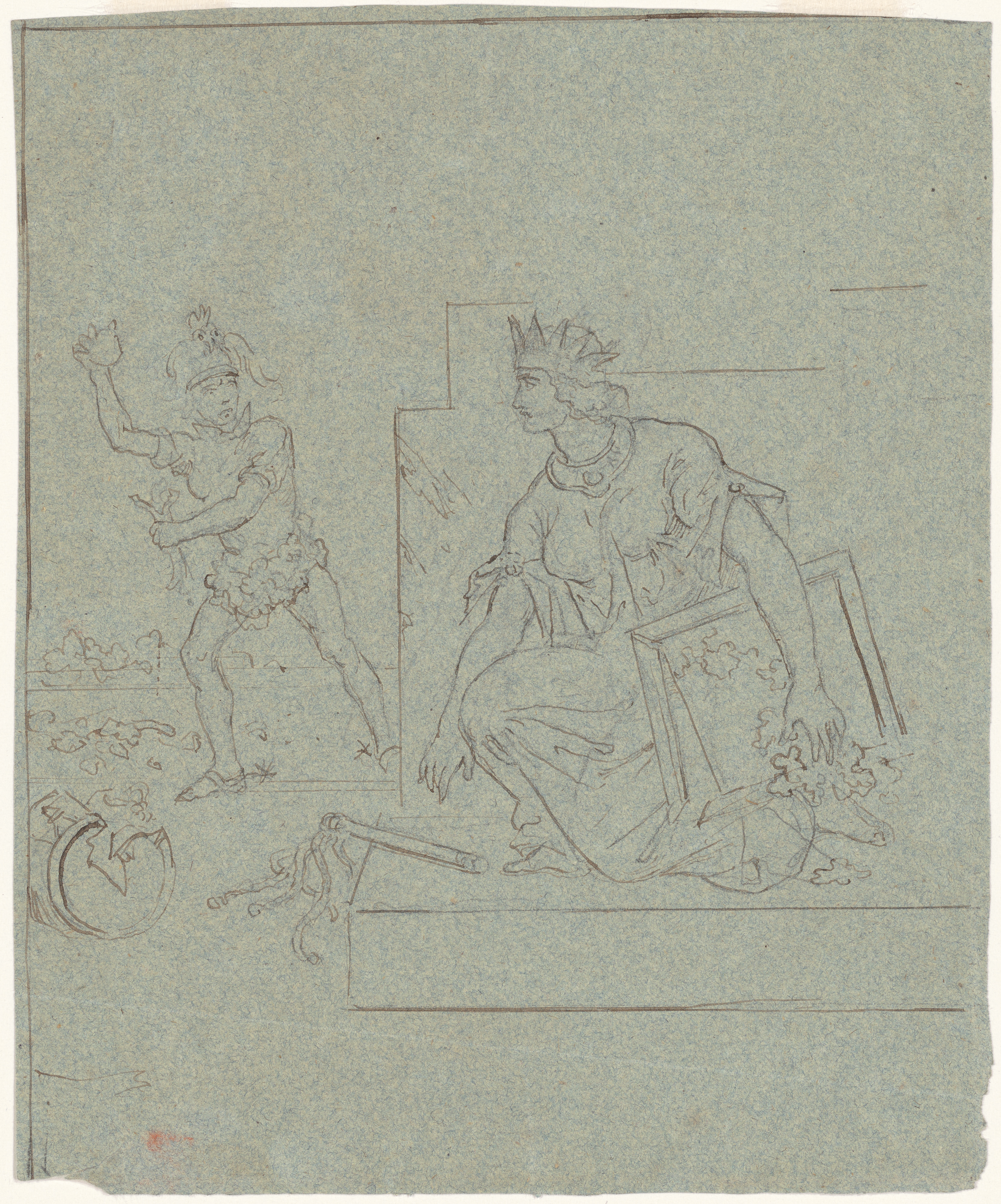
Political Cartoon of the American Civil War, c. 1860s, National Gallery of Art

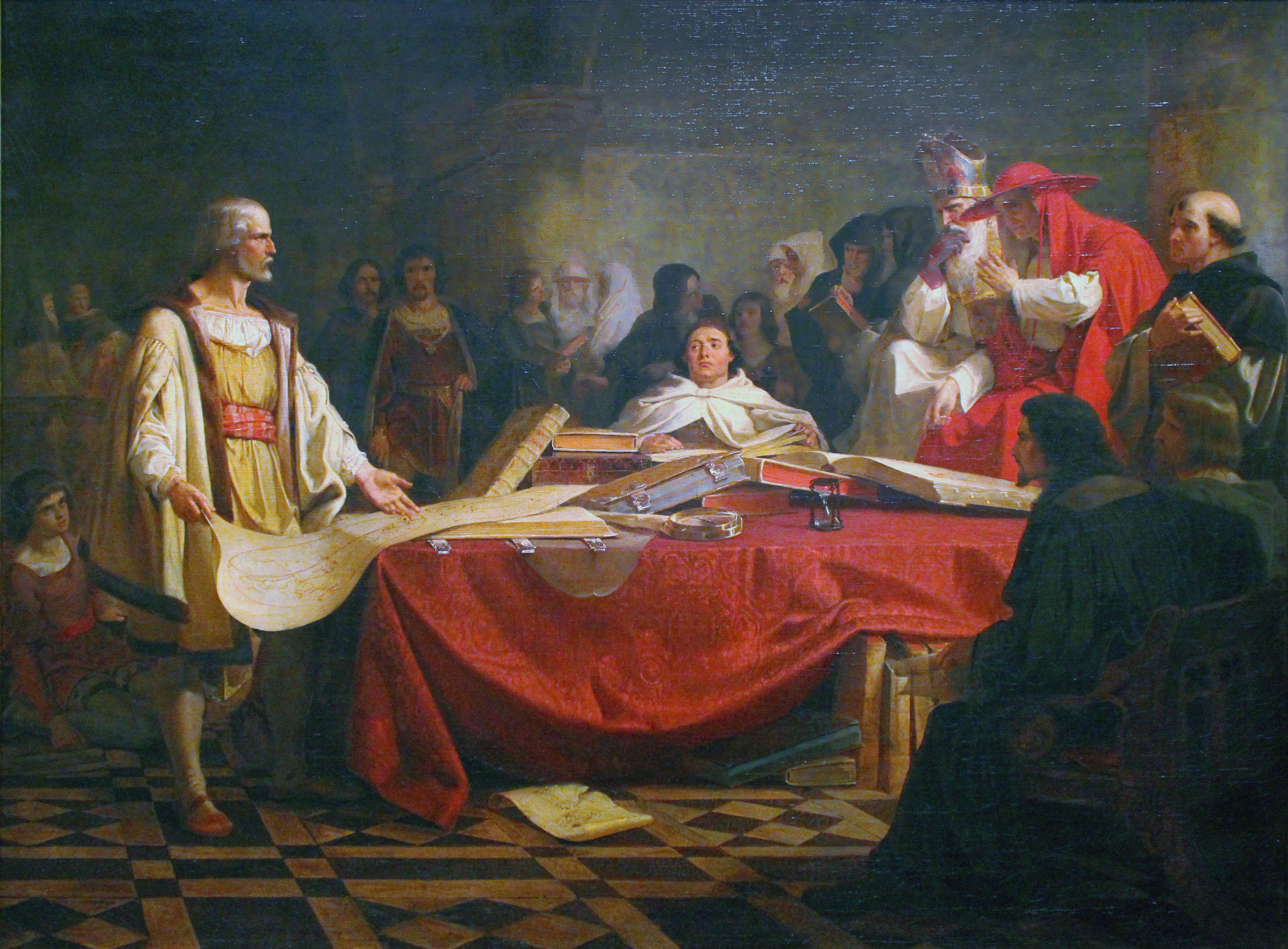
Christopher Columbus Before the Council of Salamanca (1841)
