= The Storming of the Teocalli by Cortez and His Troops =

Painting by Emanuel Leutze

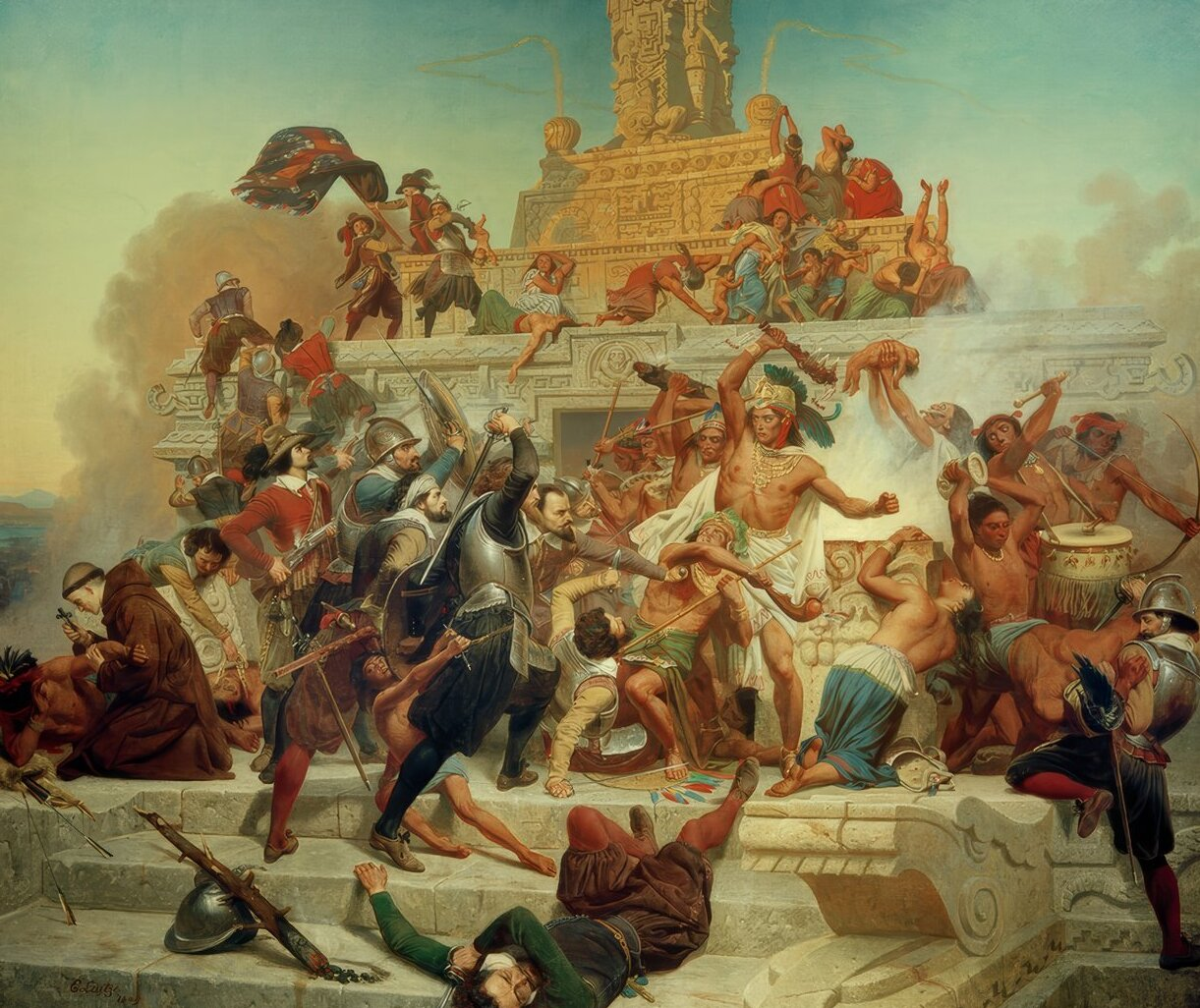
- Artist: Emanuel Leutze
- Year: 1848
- Medium: Oil on canvas
- Dimensions: 215.3 cm × 250.9 cm (84.8 in × 98.8 in)
- Location: Wadsworth Atheneum, Hartford, United States

The Storming of the Teocalli by Cortez and His Troops is an 1848 oil-on-canvas painting by the German American history painter, Emanuel Leutze.

== Background ==
The painting is based on William H. Prescott's description of events in his 1843 book, History of the Conquest of Mexico. It was painted in Düsseldorf, Germany, in 1848 and first exhibited in New York City in 1849, at a time when some believed it to be a commentary on the recent Mexican–American War. In 1991 the painting was exhibited at the Smithsonian American Art Museum in Washington D.C. in The West as America Art Exhibition and brewed up new discussion as to whose side it takes in the conflict.

The painting depicts the heat of the fight at the teocalli of Tenochtitlan between the heavily armed Spaniards, led by Hernán Cortés, and the Aztecs, who despite their inferior weapons, attempt a fierce but ultimately futile defense.

Today the work is displayed as part of the permanent collection of the Wadsworth Atheneum in Hartford, Connecticut, United States.
