= The Deluge towards Its Close =

Painting by Joshua Shaw

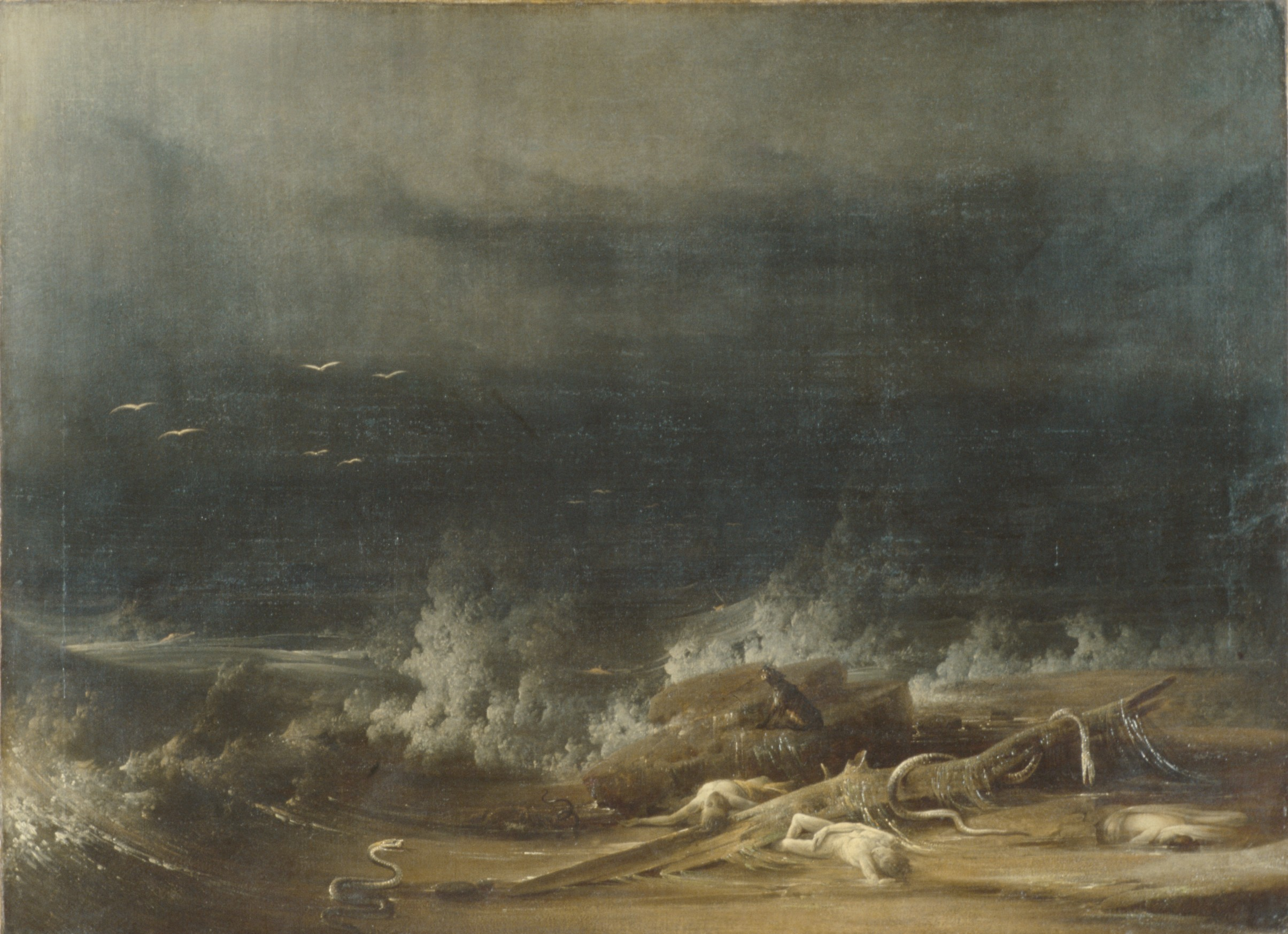
- Artist: Joshua Shaw
- Year: c. 1813
- Medium: Oil on canvas
- Dimensions: 122.6 cm × 167.6 cm (48.3 in × 66.0 in)
- Location: Metropolitan Museum of Art; New York City

The Deluge towards Its Close is an early 19th century painting by American artist Joshua Shaw. Done in oil on canvas, the work depicts the aftermath of a storm or flood. The Metropolitan Museum of Art, which holds the painting in its collection, compares Deluge's dark an dour themes as being in the Western tradition of portraying the Biblical flood. The painting was praised by painter Benjamin West, who had also produced works concerning the Biblical flood.
