= My Bunkie =

Painting by Charles Schreyvogel

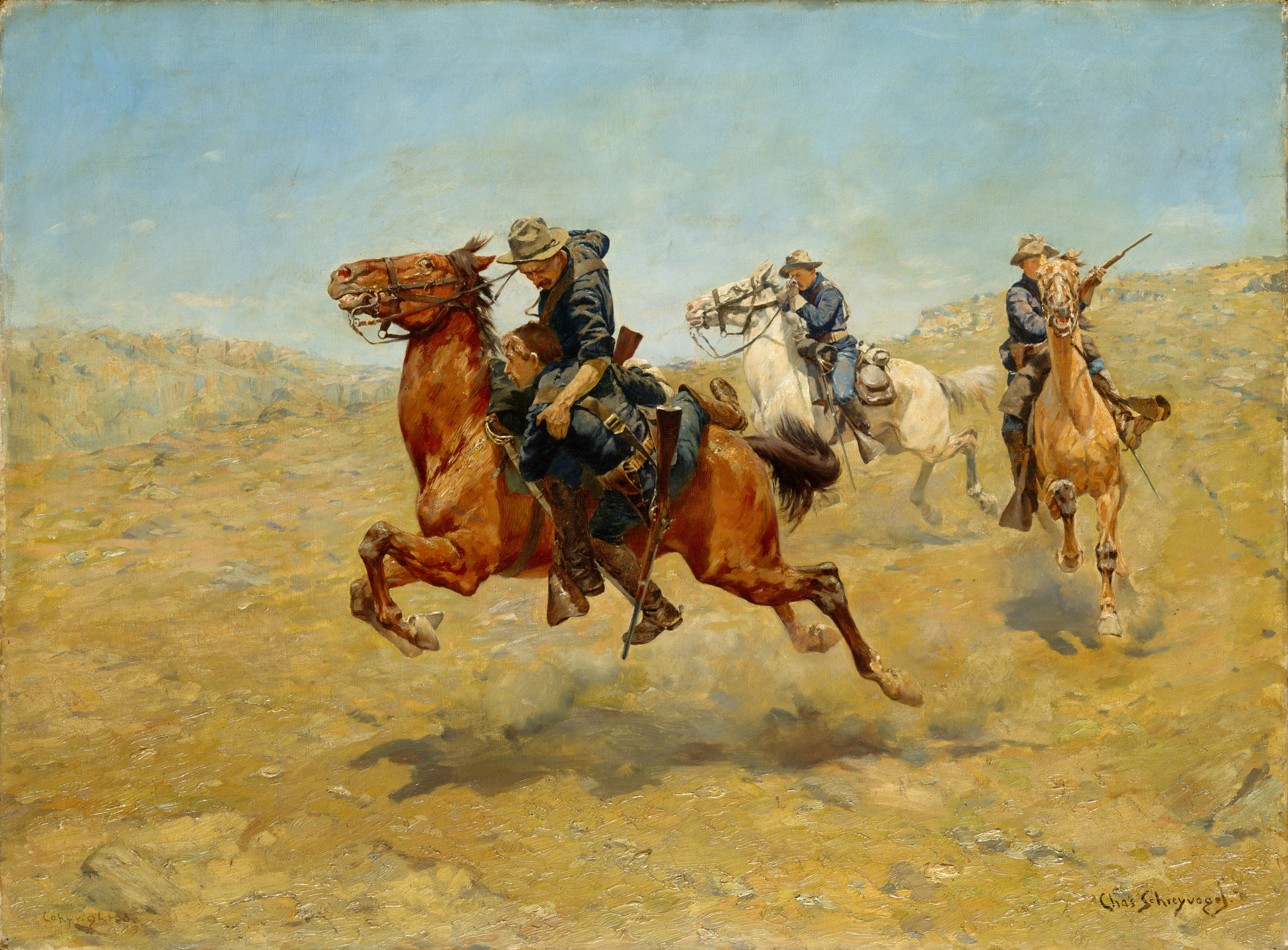
- Artist: Charles Schreyvogel
- Year: 1899
- Medium: Oil on canvas
- Dimensions: 64 cm × 86.4 cm (25 in × 34.0 in)
- Location: Metropolitan Museum of Art; New York City
- Accession: 12.227

My Bunkie is a late 19th-century painting by American artist Charles Schreyvogel. Done in oil on canvas, My Bunkie depicts a martial scene in which the US cavalry battle an unseen Native American enemy in the American West. Schreyvogel's work is in the collection of the Metropolitan Museum of Art.

== Description ==
Schreyvogel's work depicts a scene in which a group of US cavalrymen fight against a force of Native Americans, who are left unseen. One of the cavalrymen has been dismounted in the skirmish, prompting his comrade to rescue him by pulling him onto his own mount. The scene is based on an account told to Schreyvogel by a cavalry trooper he met in Colorado. Following its 1899 presentation in New York, Schreyvogel's painting won the Thomas Clarke prize.

As noted in the Metropolitan Museum of Art's description of the painting, My Bunkie is comparable to Wounded Bunkie, a work by Frederic Remington. The Met describes My Bunkie as portraying "a combination of firsthand experience and masculine escapist fantasy" typical of Schreyvogel's style.
