= Teocalli =

Style of Mesoamerican pyramid

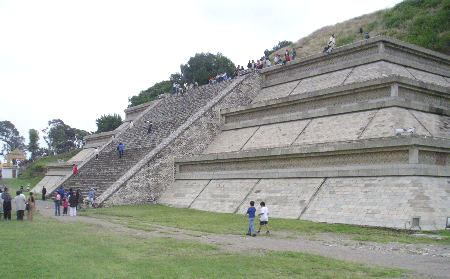
The teocalli of Cholula

A teocalli (Nahuatl: "God-house") is a Mesoamerican pyramid surmounted by a temple. The pyramid is terraced, and some of the most important religious rituals in Pre-Columbian Mexico took place in the temple at the top of the pyramid.

The famous, although no longer extant, Aztec Huey Teocalli ("Great Temple," Spanish, Templo Mayor) was located next to what is now Mexico City's main square, the Zócalo. A famous 1848 painting by Emanuel Leutze depicts The Storming of Teocalli by Cortez and his Troops, which Leutze painted four years before his classic Washington Crossing the Delaware. One of the Cuban poet José María Heredia's best-known poems is titled En el teocalli de Cholula.

== In contemporary culture ==
The term is also used in a modern context by Chicano people involved in the Native American Church. Chicano chapters of the Native American Church refer to the organization as a "teocalli."

== See also ==
- Cholula (Mesoamerican site)
- Cholula, Puebla
- Churubusco
- Great Pyramid of Cholula
