= J. K. Ralston =

American artist (1896–1987)

- Born: James Kenneth Ralston; March 31, 1896; Choteau, Montana
- Died: November 26, 1987 (aged 91); Billings, Montana
- Education: Chicago Art Institute
- Known for: Painting
- Notable work: Call Of The Bugle, Crossing the Redwater, Custer's Last Hope, Sacajawea At The Portage
- Movement: Old American West
- Spouse: Willo (1923-?)
- Awards: Gold Medal, National Cowboy Hall of Fame

James Kenneth "J.K." Ralston (March 31, 1896 – November 26, 1987) was an American painter of the Old American West whose primary topics were the American West and images of cowboys and American Indians. He also did commercial artwork.

== Life and career ==
Ralston's family moved to Colorado from Independence, Missouri in 1859 by ox team, then Idaho in 1863, and finally Montana in 1864, seeking gold each time. Ralston's father, William R. Ralston, "arrived in Highland, a settlement on Alder Gulch" on July 4, 1864, settling on a ranch "about 12 miles" from Choteau, Montana in 1877. Ralston was born in 1896 in Choteau, Montana. His family moved to Helena, Montana before he was 10 years old. When he was 10, in 1906, they moved to the Capital P ranch in Dawson County, Montana in northeastern Montana. He spent his early adult years as a cowboy in eastern Montana. In 1917, after completing high school, he "rode a cattle train to Chicago," where he attended the Chicago Art Institute for three months before joining the United States Army in spring of 1918. He served in the 62nd Infantry, Eighth Division in World War I. This unit served overseas but did not see combat. Ralston returned to the Chicago Art Institute in the fall of 1920.

In 1923 Ralston married Willo and they lived on the Pacific coast for seven years. They returned to Montana in 1930 and took over the Roman E, his father's ranch, near Culbertson, Montana. The Great Depression forced them to move to Billings, Montana in 1935. Ralston opened a studio in Billings and worked as a professional full-time artist. His works include Treasury Section of Fine Arts murals at the Richland County Courthouse and General Sully at Yellowstone in 1942 for the post office in Sidney, Montana as well as a post office mural, The Fate of a Mail Carrier - Charloie Nolan - 1876 in Sturgis, South Dakota. He earned He also created public art for the First National Bank in Billings, and for the Westerners Club in Las Vegas.

Ralston died in 1987 in Billings.

== Legacy ==
The MonDak Arts & Historical Society, which is located in Sidney, Montana and was founded in 1967, opened the J. K. Ralston Museum and Art Center in 1972. This operated until 1984 when the Center was moved to the newly completed MonDak Heritage Center in Sidney. Ralston's works are on display at the Buffalo Bill Historical Center in Cody, Wyoming, the Western Heritage Center in Billings, the Montana Historical Society in Helena, the Little Bighorn Battlefield National Monument near Crow Agency, Montana, and the Gateway Arch National Park in St. Louis, Missouri. In 1946 Ralston and his son built a log cabin art studio for him to work in. After his death, Ralston's log cabin studio was first moved to Rocky Mountain College in Billings and then to the Western Heritage Center in 2005.

In 1978, Ralston was awarded a Gold Medal by the National Cowboy Hall of Fame, which inducted him into the Hall of Great Westerners. He was inducted into the Montana Cowboy Hall of Fame in 2012.

Sacajawea At The Portage, sample of Ralston's painting style

== See also ==
- Frederic Remington, western artist
- Charles Marion Russell, western artist
- Charles Schreyvogel, western artist
- Earl W. Bascom, western artist and sculptor
