= Joshua Shaw =

English painter

- Born: 1776; Billingborough, Lincolnshire, England
- Died: 1860 (aged 83–84); New Jersey, United States
- Occupations: inventor, glass cutter & firearms, artist, writer

Joshua Shaw (1776–1860) was an English-born American artist and inventor.

== Early life ==
Joshua Shaw was born in Billingborough, Lincolnshire, England in 1776. When Shaw was seven years old, his father died, and the ensuing hardship lead him to work for a local farmer as a bird scarer. During the three years he spent doing this work he discovered his artistic talent and began drawing the animals he encountered. After his mother remarried Shaw worked for his stepfather's plumbing and glazing business, and later as a mail carrier.

== Artistic career ==
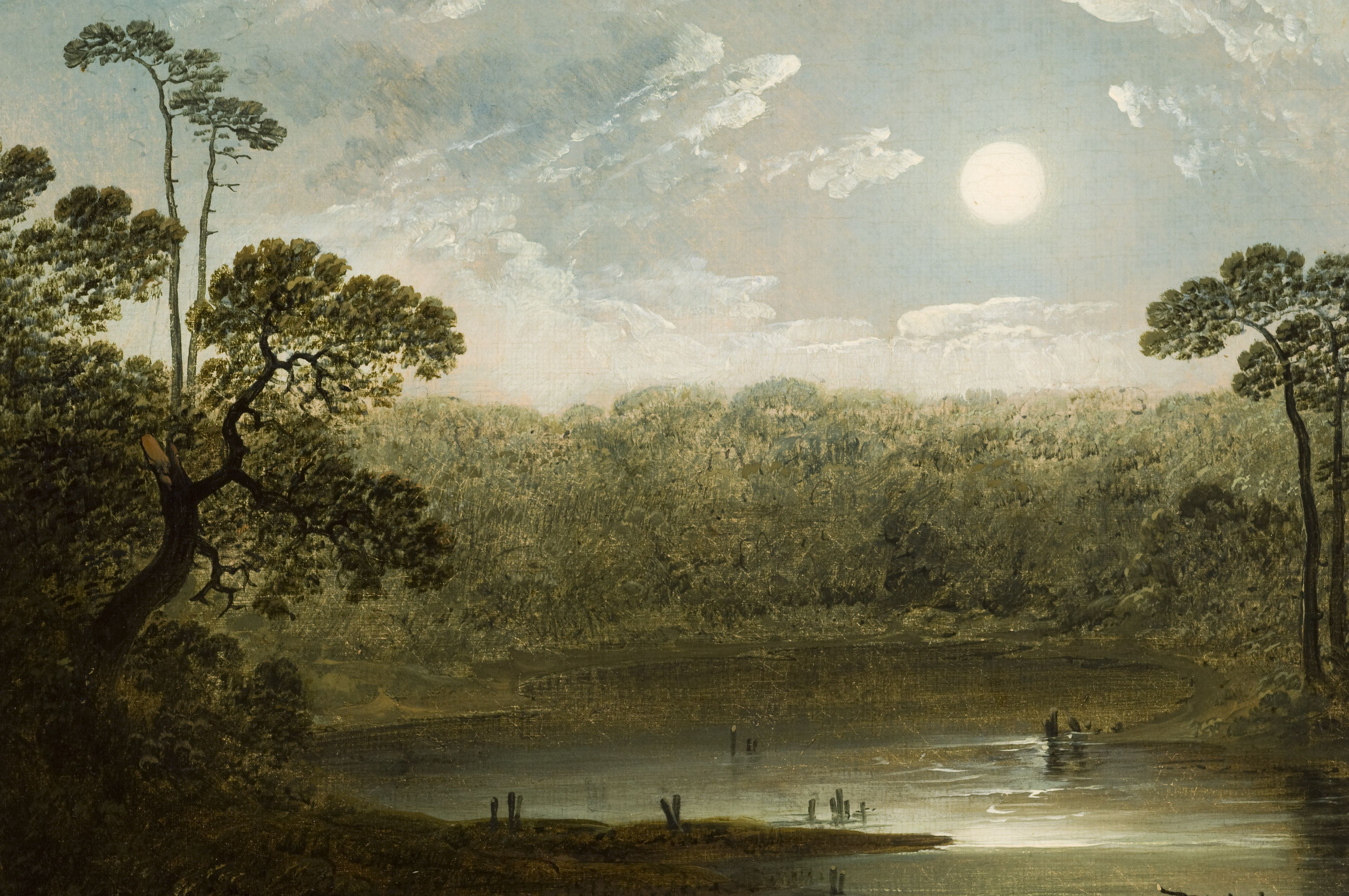
Witch Duck Creek, oil on canvas, c. 1835. Reynolda House Museum of American Art

At the age of 16 Shaw painted his first work: 10 commandments in St Michael's Church. His master, jealous of Shaw's skills, sent him to Manchester to work as a foreman. Shaw was able to find purchasers for his work and emerged from obscurity, traveling to London where his paintings attracted many wealthy clients.

Shaw emigrated to the United States in 1817 and by 1819 settled in Philadelphia, where he established himself as an artist. In 1820 he collaborated with John Hill, an aquatint engraver, on a collection of large folio prints titled "Picturesque Views of American Scenery." Shaw provided the paintings, which Hill reproduced as prints.

Shaw's landscape paintings were picturesque in style, a logical result of his English training. His landscapes typically included "a dark foreground, generalized trees or hills framing the composition in the foreground and middleground, a stream or lake, and distant hills. All of these elements are a direct influence of Claude Lorraine's 17th-century idealized landscapes of the Roman countryside." Claude Lorraine, in turn, was an influence on 18th and early 19th century British landscape painters.

Although fellow artist William Dunlap called Shaw "an ignorant, conceited English blockhead," he participated actively in the cultural life of his adopted city. He helped promote the Artists' Fund Society of Philadelphia, established in 1834, and was instrumental in founding the Artists' and Amateurs' Association of Philadelphia in 1839. He also exhibited actively at the Pennsylvania Academy of the Fine Arts.

By 1843 Shaw retired to Bordentown, New Jersey, northeast of Philadelphia. In his retirement he sold few paintings and died in poverty in 1860.

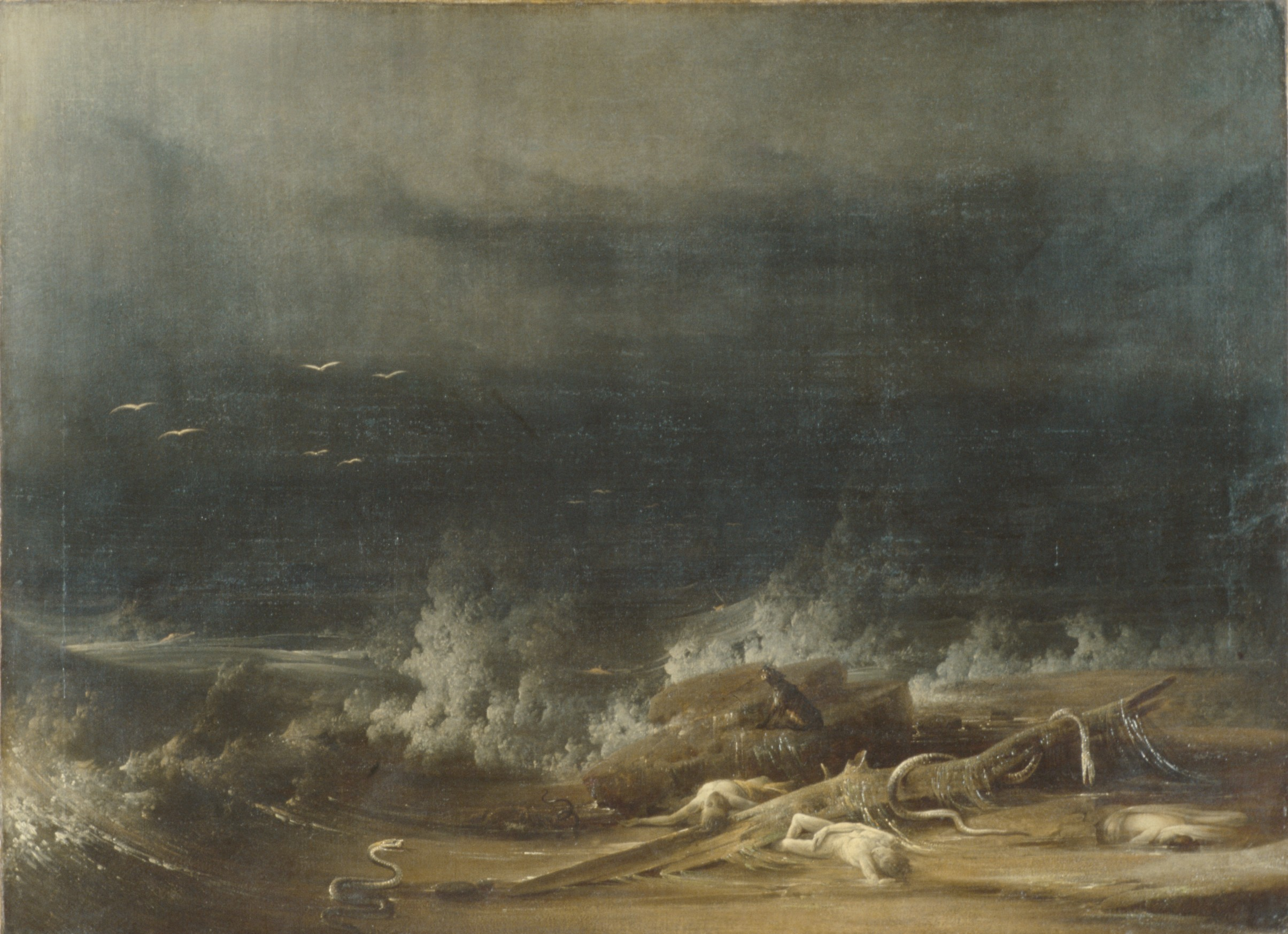
The Deluge towards Its Close, oil on canvas, c. 1813. Metropolitan Museum of Art

== Inventions ==
According to Shaw in an autobiographical pamphlet 'about the year 1814 or '15, invented the instrument known, and now in general use throughout the civilised world, as the Patent Diamond, used by glaziers for cutting glass'. Joshua Shaw (a.k.a. Joseph Shaw) claimed to have invented the copper percussion cap in 1814, but experts no longer consider this a valid claim as there is no independent contemporary evidence to support this. Rival claimants were Col. Peter Hawker, James Purdey although the strongest and earliest claim (according to Capt. Lacy in The Modern Shooter pub.1842) was by Joseph Egg (Eck, French by birth to Swiss parents). Shaw was indeed a developer of percussion primers and a gun dated to be no earlier than 1817, was made by William Smith of Lisle Street in London to test his prototype steel cap according to his own account. Shaw, writing in the Journal of the Franklin Institute in 1829 states that he adopted the use fulminate of mercury, which was improvement over the corrosive chlorate of potash fulminate patented by Alexander John Forsyth. Fulminate of mercury was discovered by Edward Howard in 1800 who tried unsuccessfully to use it in firearms as a substitute for gunpowder. It was developed further as an alternative primer to ignite a gunpowder charge by E. Goode Wright in 1823 ('On the Substitution of Fulminating Mercury'...) and its success inspired Frederick Joyce, a London chemist, to swiftly produce mercury-fulminate non-corrosive percussion caps in quantity within a year. Joshua Shaw claimed that around 1814 or 1815 (when he was supposedly inventing the percussion cap) he was 'induced to investigate the properties of the different compositions, and...originate through chemical means and manipulations, an entirely new material, perfectly free from the corrosive properties of those in use at the time.' this would have pre-dated Goode Wright by nine years but there is no contemporary historical evidence to back this up and Shaw was not a chemist or well educated, so seems very unlikely.

In 1816 Forsyth filed for an injunction against Joseph Manton's patent for the tube lock or scent-bottle lock and the suit was found in favor of Forsyth in 1818. He also successfully filed suits against Joseph Vicars, William Beckwith, and Jackson Mortimer in 1811; Isaac Riviere in 1819, and Collinson Hall in 1819. Forsyth's patent expired on April 11, 1821. However, there was no evidence these lawsuits influenced Shaw.

Shaw went to Philadelphia in 1817 and filed a patent on June 19, 1822, which was granted erroneously as American patent law disallowed applications if an earlier patent existed anywhere in the world. The U.S. Patent Office was apparently unaware of earlier patents by Prélat and Deboubert in France in 1820. The French patents were copied from British percussion gunlocks on guns by Forsyth and Egg and imported to Paris. The 1822 patent was surrendered to the Patent Office in 1829 to obtain a revised patent and was reissued on May 7, 1829. His patent was overturned by Circuit Court for the Southern District of New York in October 1829 and upheld in by the U.S. Supreme Court in January 1833. At some point prior to 1823 the U.S. Ordnance Department converted one of John Hall's breech-loading rifles to test Shaw's percussion caps and based on this, despite the Supreme Court ruling, successfully petitioned Congress for compensation for use of his patent. In 1846 the U.S. Congress authorized a payment to Shaw in the amount of $25,000. He received $18,000 on May 4, 1847, and the remainder by 1858.

During the Regency era the percussion cap, along with Forsyth and Manton's inventions, became popular among hunters on both sides of the Atlantic. By 1827 copper percussion caps were manufactured by the millions in both England and France and imported to the U.S. A number of people in the U.S., including Joseph Cooper as early as 1824 were manufacturing them in smaller quantities by 1827. In the 1840s the British, French and Russian armies began adopting his form of ignition. The Austrians, by contrast, preferred the tube-lock derived from Joseph Manton's design. The Model 1841 Springfield rifled musket was the first percussion-lock firearm produced for the U.S. Ordnance Department.

Shaw returned to England in 1833 with his new design for cannon locks. His invention was adopted by both the British and the Russians.

By the time Shaw died in 1860 he was well-known and respected in America as a member of the Franklin Institute; in addition to being an artist and scientist he was a prolific writer.
