= Charles Schreyvogel =

American painter

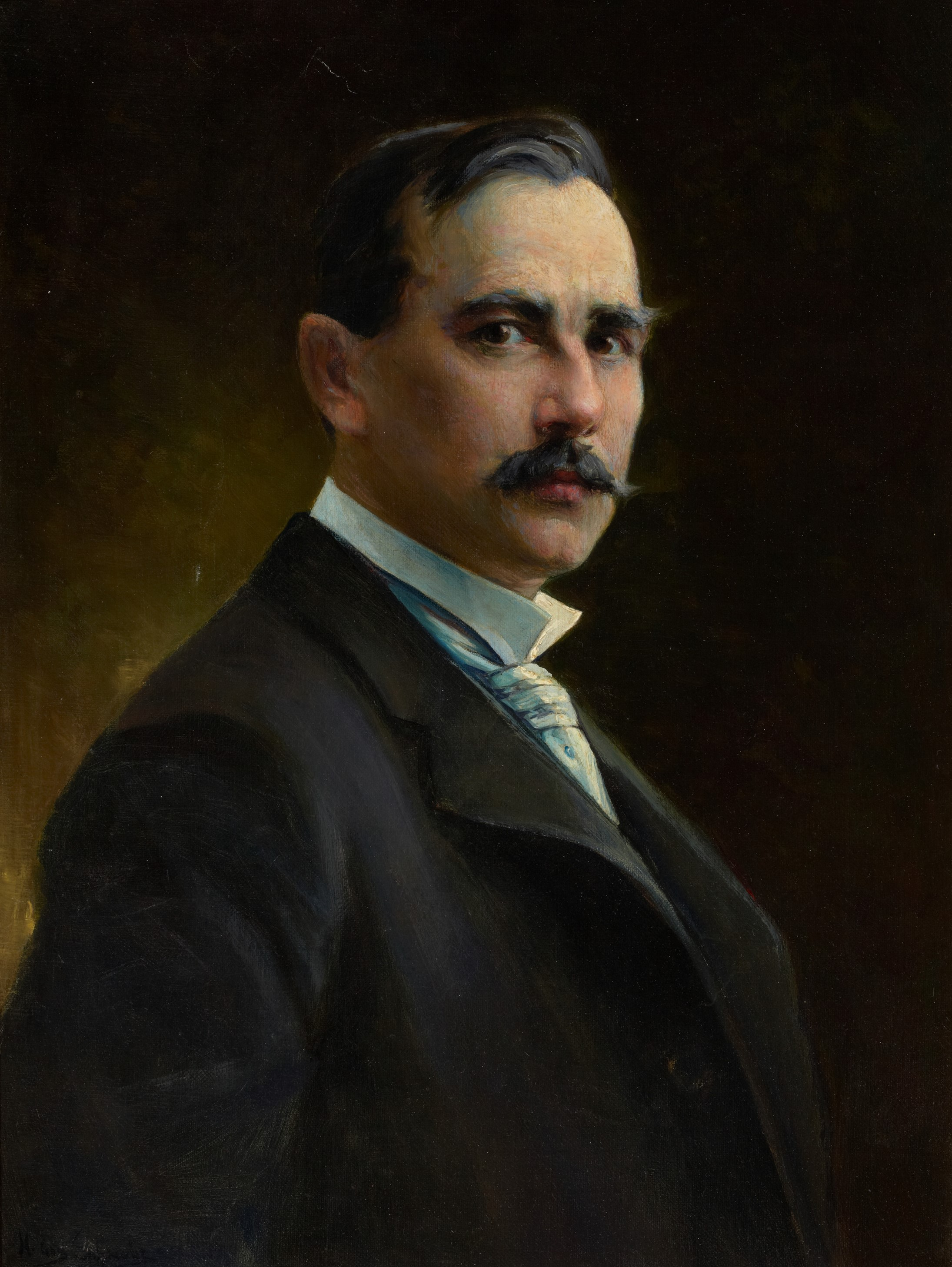
Portrait

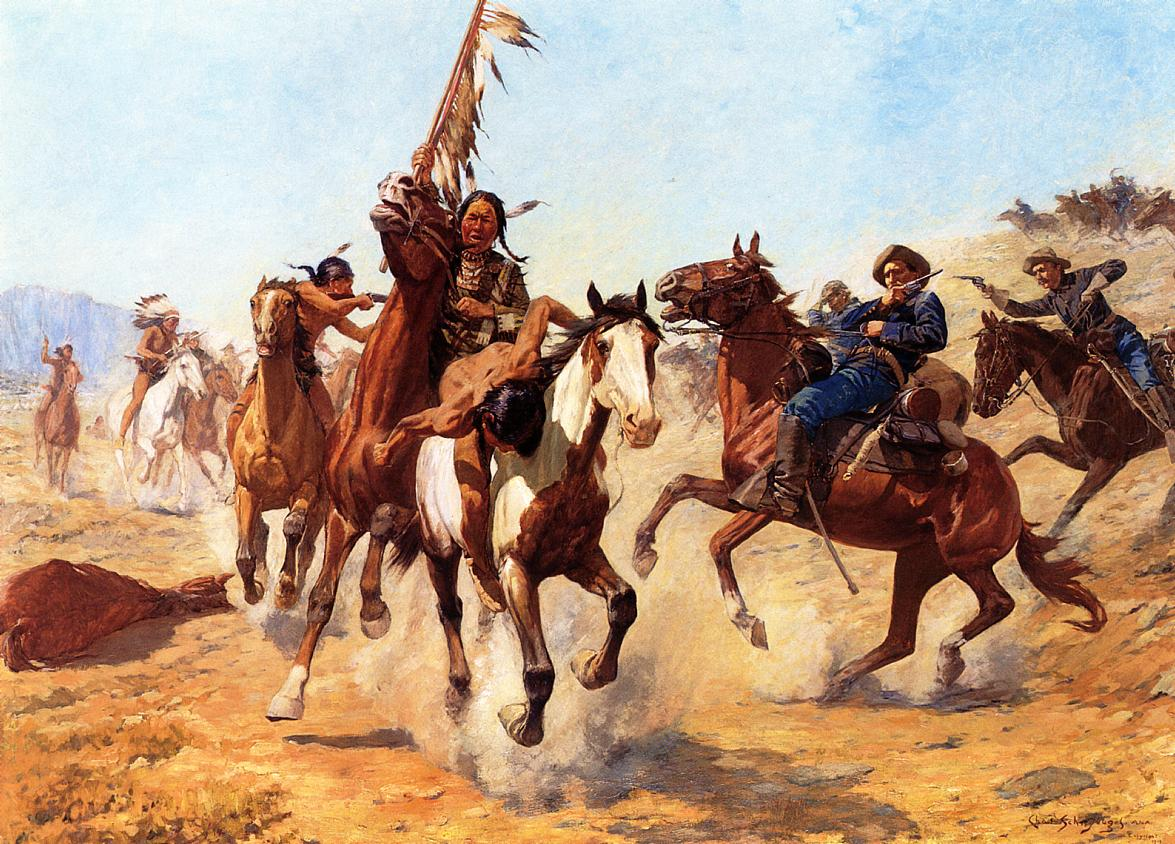
The Silenced War Whoop by Charles Schreyvogel

Charles Schreyvogel (January 4, 1861 – January 27, 1912) was an American painter of Western subject matter in the days of the disappearing frontier. Schreyvogel was especially interested in military life.

== Life ==
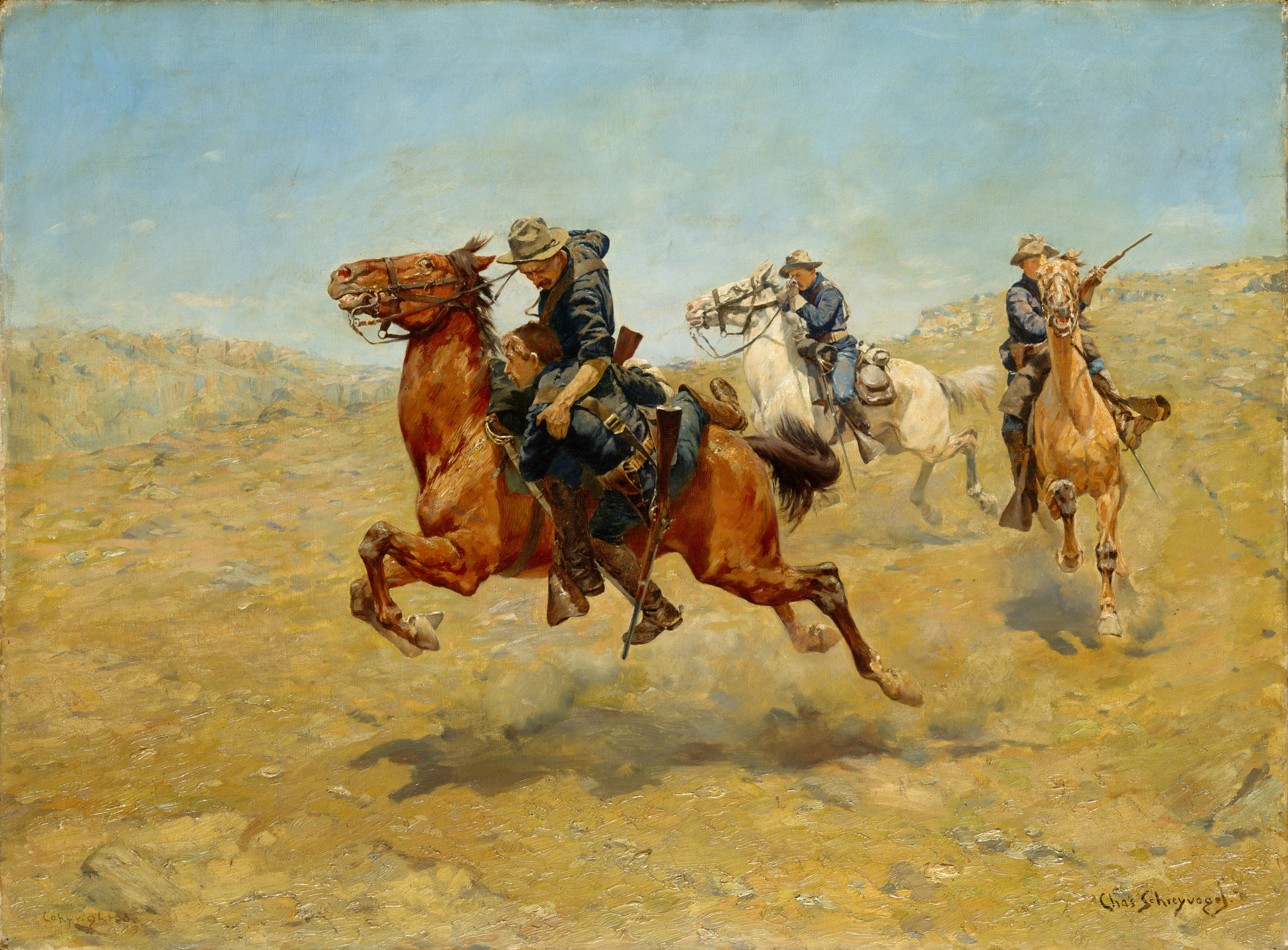
My Bunkie by Charles Schreyvogel, 1899, in the collection of the Metropolitan Museum of Art

He was born in Hoboken, New Jersey to Paul and Theresa Schreyvogel, and grew up in a poor family of German immigrant shopkeepers on the Lower East Side of New York. Schreyvogel was unable to afford art classes and he taught himself to draw.

When Buffalo Bill Cody's Wild West show came to Brooklyn in 1894, Schreyvogel visited to sketch. He went on to become famous for his depictions of the American West, although he did much of his work in his studio (or its rooftop) in decidedly non-Western Hoboken.

In 1901, his painting My Bunkie was awarded the Thomas Clarke Prize at the annual exhibition of the National Academy of Design. He suddenly became recognized and earned what seemed like overnight fame. In 1902 Schreyvogel was elected to the Salmagundi Club New York as both Artist Member and Associate National Academician, remaining so until his death.

He died in Hoboken in 1912 and is buried in Flower Hill Cemetery, North Bergen, New Jersey.

Works by Schreyvogel are included in the collections of the National Cowboy & Western Heritage Museum, Oklahoma City, Oklahoma, the Sid Richardson Museum, Fort Worth, Texas, the Metropolitan Museum of Art, and the Gilcrease Museum, Tulsa, Oklahoma.

== See also ==
- Charles Marion Russell, western artist
- J. K. Ralston, western artist
- Frederic Remington, western artist

== Notes ==
- James D. Horan. The Life And Art Of Charles Schreyvogel: Painter-Historian Of The Indian-Fighting Army Of The American West. New York: Crown Publishers Inc., 1969.
- Rick Stewart. The American West: Legendary Artists of the Frontier. Hawthorne Publishing Company, 1986.
