= William Smith Jewett =

American painter (1821–1873)

- Born: 1821; Dover, New York, U.S.
- Died: 1873 (aged 51–52); Springfield, Massachusetts, U.S.
- Education: New York Academy of Design
- Occupation: Painter
- Children: William Dunbar Jewett

William Smith Jewett (1821–1873) was an American painter.

Jewett was born in South Dover, New York. He studied painting at the New York Academy of Design, where he became an associate in 1845. He sold many paintings through the American Art-Union, and he exhibited his artwork at the Academy of Design in 1841–1851.

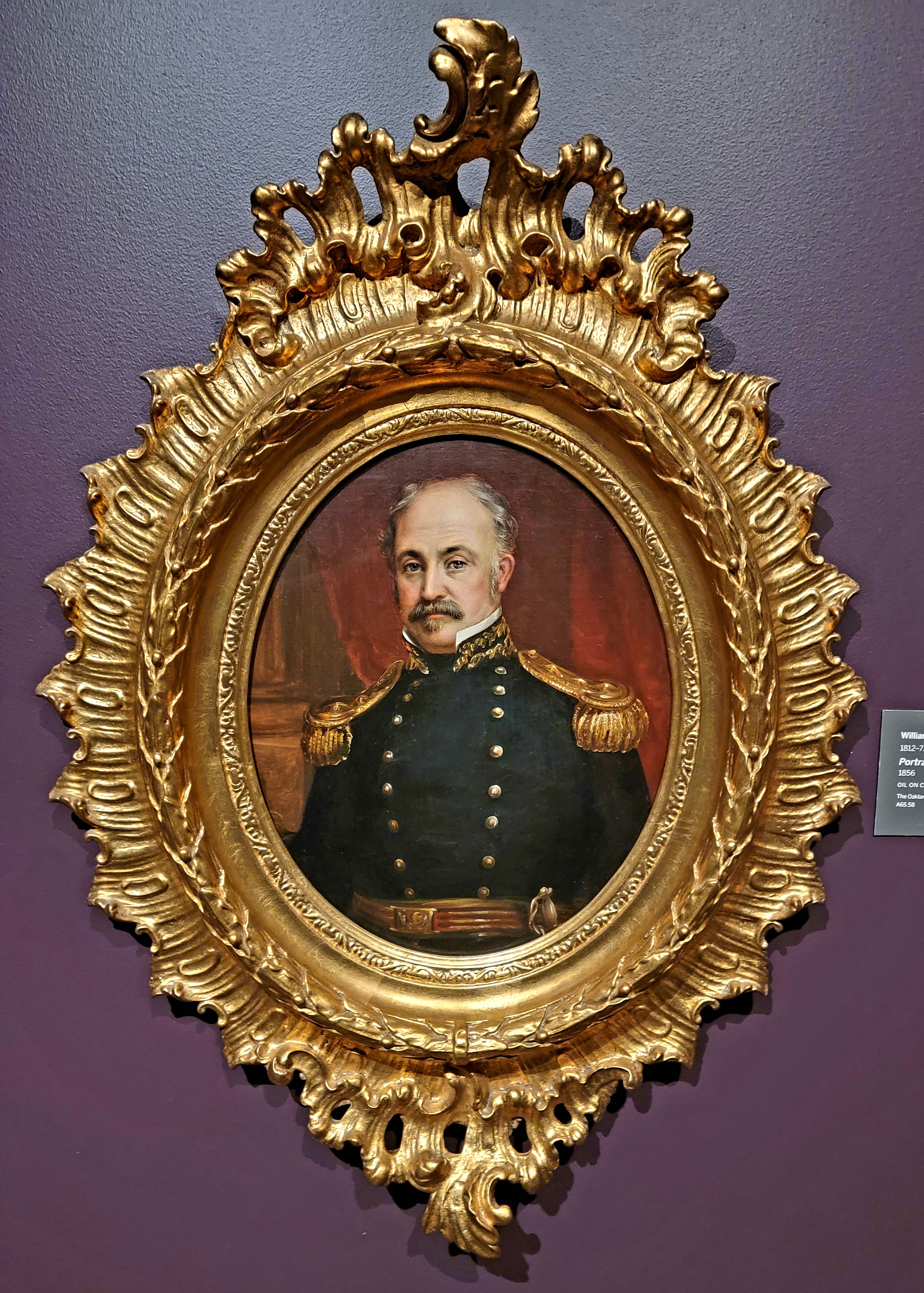
1856 portrait of John Sutter by William Smith Jewett at the Oakland Museum of California

Jewett moved to San Francisco, California in 1851, where he joined the Society of California Pioneers and he did many portraits of pioneers like him, including John Sutter. Jewett died in Springfield, Massachusetts. His son, William Dunbar Jewett, became a sculptor.
