= Terry-Norman rifle =

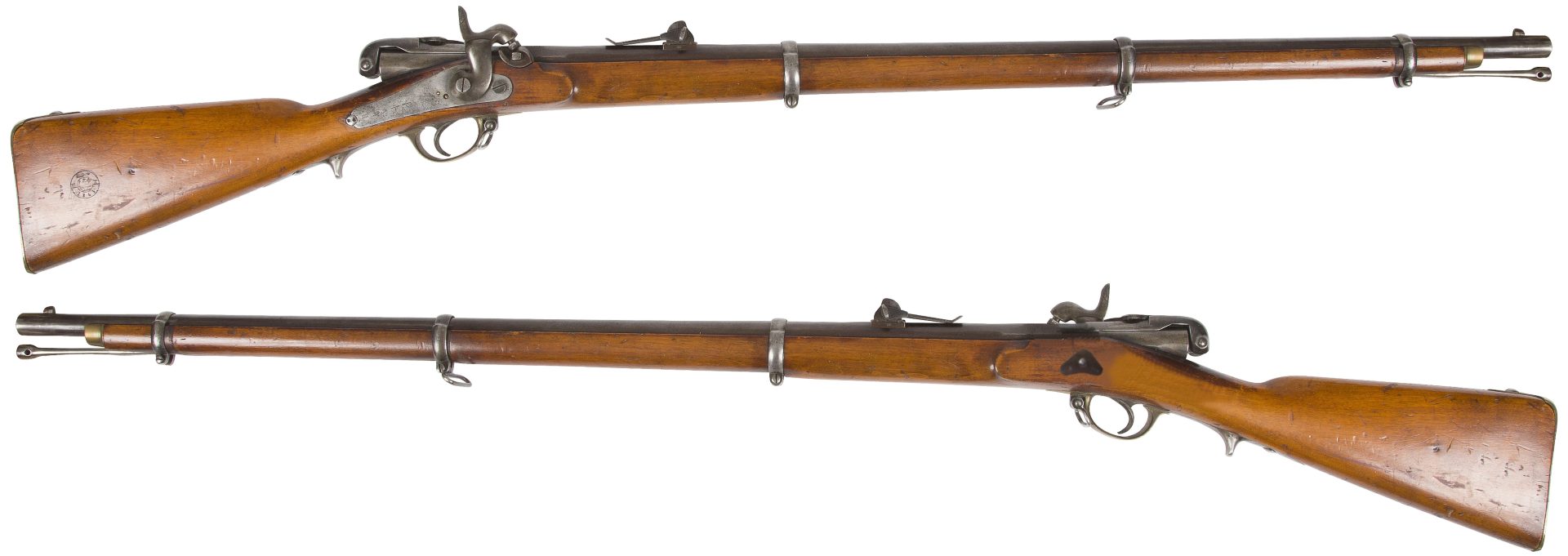
- The Terry-Norman rifle. The rifle has a rotating bolt breech and a percussion cap mechanism.
- Type: Breechloading rifle
- Place of origin: United Kingdom; Russian Empire

Service history
- In service: 1866–1886
- Used by: Russian Empire
- Wars: Russian conquest of Central Asia; Russo-Turkish War

Production history
- Designer: Terry (England); Norman (Russia)
- Designed: 1865
- Developed from: M1856 six-line rifle musket
- Produced: 1866–1867
- No. built: ~ 62 000

Specifications
- Mass: 4,4 kg
- Length: 1340 mm (without bayonet)
- Cartridge: 15,24 mm paper cartridge
- Caliber: 15,24 mm
- Action: Breechloading bolt action
- Rate of fire: 5-6 rounds per minute
- Muzzle velocity: 305 m/s
- Feed system: Single-shot

The Terry-Norman rifle (Russian: Терри-Норман, romanized: Terri-Norman) is an early Russian breech-loading rifle that was developed in 1865. It was originally designed by English gunsmith Terry and improved by a Russian gunsmith Norman. The rifle was named Terry-Norman due to their shared contribution.

The rifle was designed to recycle muzzleloading rifled muskets and convert them into breech loading rifles. The Terry-Norman rifle was adopted by the Imperial Russian Army and it was briefly manufactured before being replaced by more advanced rifle designs.

The Terry-Norman rifle was a part of the Russian modernization process that took place following the defeat in the Crimean War.

Although the Terry-Norman rifle was quickly replaced by a more advanced Carle rifle, more than 60 000 rifles were produced. The Terry-Norman rifle was used on various frontiers and it saw limited use in the Russian conquest of Central Asia and the Russo-Turkish War of 1877-1878.

== Background ==
After experiencing defeats on the battlefields of the Crimean War, it became evident that the Imperial Russian Army needed reform and modernization. Tsar Alexander II performed a military reform, among other reforms, in order modernize the Russian army. A part of the modernization was to rearm the Russian army.

Soon after the Crimean War ended, the modernization process began. The Russian army first adopted the minie ball as a new form of munition and rifle calibers were decreased to 15,24 mm - more commonly known in Russia as the six-line. Next, the M1856 rifled musket was developed and launched into production on November 20, 1856. Between 800 000 and 1 000 000 rifled muskets were made and that effectively rearmed the Russian army. However, breechloading rifles were being developed in Europe and America. As breechloading rifles demonstrated their superiority, many European countries recognized the necessity to adopt breechloading rifles.

The task of developing a modern breechloading rifle for the Russian army was handled to Main Artillery Directorate.

Due to the low levels of industrialization in the Russian Empire, the Russian arms manufacturers could produce original breechloading rifles. To solve that shortcoming, the Main Artillery Directorate sought reuse and recycle the M1856 rifled muskets. The Directorate's plan was to find an efficient design that could replace the breech of a muzzle-loading rifle with a breechloading mechanism.

While searching for an efficient design, the Main Artillery Directorate tested out dozens of original mechanisms and they tested dozens of foreign rifles. Among the foreign rifles, the Dreyse needle gun was the most popular.

== Design and production ==
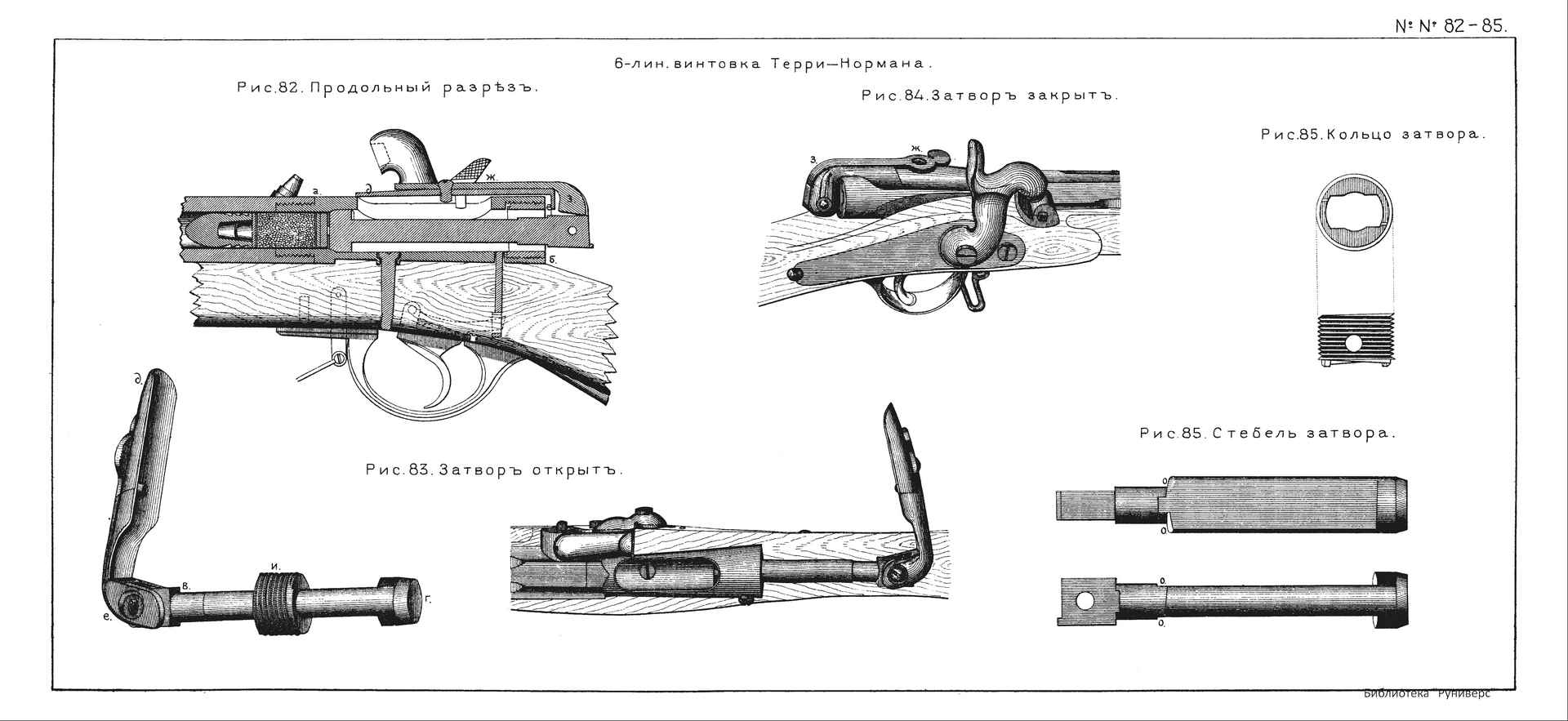
The Terry-Norman rifle. It features a rotating bolt breech. The cartridge was inserted from the top side of the rifle. The retained caplock mechanism required a user to manually change it after each shot, thus slowing the firing rate.

The design of Terry-Norman was one of the more successful designs. The original mechanism was designed by an English gunsmith Terry. Terry's design had the breech located on the side of the rifle. His designed was improved by gunsmith Norman, a Russian gunsmith from Tula. Norman's design had the breech located on top of the rifle. Due to their shared contribution, the rifle was presented as the Terry-Norman rifle.

The Terry-Norman rifle featured a simple rotating bolt mechanism. However, it retained the percussion cap mechanism form the M1856 rifle. The retention of the mechanism allowed the rifle to be simple for manufacturing and remain cost-efficient. Unfortunately, it also decreased the rifle's rate of fire because the mechanism required the cap to be replaced manually after each shot. The rifle's rate of fire was only 5-6 rounds per minute. In comparison, other rifles such as Chassepot or Dreyse needle gun had a rate of fire of 8-12 rounds per minute. In some aspects, the Terry-Norman rifle was similar to the earlier models of the American Sharps rifle.

In 1866, the rifle was presented to Russia's minister of war Dmitry Milyutin, who accepted it into production while also acknowledging that it was a temporary rifle which would soon be replaced. During its brief time in adoption, around 62 000 Terry-Norman rifles were made. The retained percussion cap mechanism was soon recognized as a major disadvantage and a new design was needed. The Main Artillery Directorate sought to find a design of a breechloading needle rifle that could fire integrated paper cartridges. By 1867, the Terry-Norman rifle was replaced by the Carle rifle.

According to Fedorov, the Terry-Norman rifle was adopted to test out the manufacturing abilities of Russian arms plants. It was done so that the Main Artillery Directorate could now for sure if Russian manufacturers are capable of manufacturing breechloading rifles.

== Use ==
Despite being quickly replaced and recycled into different rifles, the Terry-Norman rifle was used in several military conflicts.

=== Russian conquest of Central Asia ===
Terry-Norman rifles were redistributed among the frontiers of the Russian Empire. Those included the military districts of Turkestan, West Siberia, East Siberia, Orenburg, and the Caucasus. Even after being replaced, some Russian regiments and battalions remained armed with the Terry-Norman rifles. The rifle was used in several Turkestan campaigns including the 1868 Bukhara campaign, the Kuldzhin campaign of 1871, the Khivan campaign of 1873, the 1875-76 campaign against the Khanate of Kokand, the 1879 Battle of Goek Tepe, and the second Battle of Goek Tepe during the campaign in Central Asia.

=== Russo-Turkish War of 1877-1878 ===
By the start of the war, most of the Russian army was armed with modern rifles - including Krnka and Berdan. Regardless, the Terry-Norman rifle was also used in the war. Despite the rifle's disadvantages, it was a breechloading rifle that could fire up to 5 rounds per minute.

The Terry-Norman rifle was more prominent in the Caucasian theatre of the war. The soldiers of the Caucasian theatre of the Russo-Turkish War of 1877-78 were armed with the Terry-Norman rifle. It is estimated that around 4000 Terry-Norman rifles were used in the war.

=== Later use ===
Peace in Europe was established following the end of the war. Besides being used in Central Asia, the Terry-Norman rifle would also be used as rifle for big-game hunting.
