= M1856 six-line rifle musket =

M1856 Six-line rifle musket
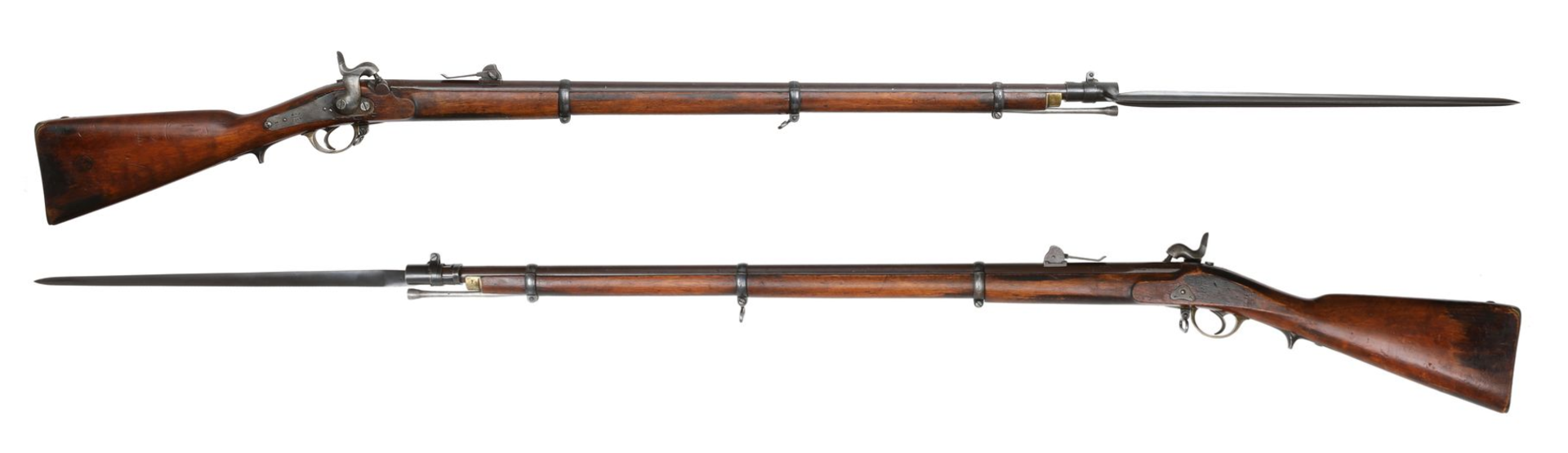
- M1856 Six-line rifle musket with a bayonet
- Type: Rifled musket
- Place of origin: Russian Empire

Service history
- In service: 1856-1865
- Used by: Russian Empire; Empire of Japan (captured)
- Wars: Caucasian War; January Uprising; Russian conquest of Central Asia; Seinan War

Production history
- Designer: Russian Ordnance Board (Note: The Russian Artillery Committee, represented by A.V. Lyadin, L.G. Rezvy, K.I. Konstantinov, and other associated members.)
- Designed: 1856
- Developed into: Gillet-Trummer rifle Terry-Norman rifle Carle rifle M1867 Russian Krnka
- Produced: 1856-1865
- No. built: 800 000~1 000 000

Specifications
- Mass: 4.4 kg
- Length: 1340 mm
- Barrel length: 939 mm
- Cartridge: Paper cartridge, Minié ball (Note: The "Peter's Ball" and "Timmerhans Ball" were Russian iterations of the expanding hollow-based Minié bullet.)
- Cartridge weight: 35,19 g
- Caliber: .60 in (15,24 mm)
- Action: Percussion lock
- Rate of fire: 3-4 rounds per minute
- Muzzle velocity: 348 m/s
- Feed system: Muzzle-loaded
- Sights: The rear sight based on Swiss-style pivoting leaf pattern

The M1856 rifle, also known as the six-line rifled musket, is a Russian caplock muzzle-loading rifle that was developed in 1856.

It was developed in response to Russia's defeat in the Crimean War. The M1856 rifle was designed to replace the outdated smoothbore muskets of the Imperial Russian Army. It was a rifled musket that was similar to the Pattern 1853 Enfield or the Springfield Model 1861.

Although the M1856 rifle rearmed the Russian army, it quickly became an outdated rifle due to the rise of breech-loading rifles.

During its short service, the rifle saw limited action in the Caucasian War, the January Uprising, and the Russian conquest of Central Asia.

The M1856 rifled muskets would later be recycled and converted into breechloading rifles including the Gillet-Trummer rifle, the Terry-Norman rifle, the Carle rifle, and the Krnka rifle.

== Background ==
During the Crimean War the majority of Russian infantry was armed with smoothbore muskets, M1808, M1828/44, and M1845/47 Tula. The smoothbore muskets would prove themselves disadvantageous against the rifled muskets of the allied forces. Despite Russia equipping with new bullet ammunition, the balle Nessler, help increasing the range. Rifled muskets had a greater firing range and they were loaded with the deadly minie cartridge. The superiority of rifled muskets was demonstrated on many battlefields of the war such as Alma or Inkerman.

Russian Imperial Armory faced a challenging situation, having adopted percussion technology one use in case M1854 Dragoon musket, considerably later than other nations. Approximately only 6,000 recruits are armed with the latest military rifles such as pre-M1856 Russian Minie or "7 Line" rifle and the M1856 Jaeger percussion rifle.

The Russian had missing 532,313 rifles, 48,032 carbines, and 31,120 muskets. Three local factories made 362,992 rifles from 1853 to 1856. Of the 55,000 rifles urgently ordered from Belgium and Prussia, only 9,184 arrived, along with failed efforts to buy guns from the United States. The Colt's company was contracted by the Russian government in the mid-1850s to provide 50,000 .69 caliber muskets intended for the ongoing Crimean War. Colt obtained surplus U.S. Model 1816/1822 (and some Model 1815) flintlock muskets, converted them to percussion locks using his patented drum bolster system, rifled the barrels, and installed specific long-range rear sights inspired by the Belgian Lüttich rifles used by Russia. However, the war ended before any delivery, leaving the contract historically unfulfilled.

Following Russia's defeat in the war, tsar Alexander II would performed a military reform that sought to reform and to modernize the Russian army. One of the steps of modernization was to rearm the Russian army.

The process started with the adoption of minie ball. In order to adopt the cartridge, the caliber of Russia rifles was decreased to 15,24 mm - more commonly known in Russia as the six-line.

After a brief development, the M1856 six-line rifle musket was presented to the tsar on October 20, 1856. On November 20, 1856, the rifle was launched into production.

== Design and features ==
The M1856 had a length of 1340 mm with a 939 mm barrel. The rifle weighed 4.4 kg. The cartridge was a minie ball with a 15,24 mm - six-line - caliber. The entire cartridge weighed 35,19 g including 4,78 g of gunpowder. The muzzle velocity was muzzle velocity of 348 m/s. The M1856 had a percussion lock mechanism. As it was designed, there were challenges in designing and adopting sights for accurate fire.

During the tests that were conducted, with targets varying from 100 to 600 paces, the M1856 rifle musket demonstrated an accuracy rate of 90%. In some cases, the M1856 could hit target that were 800 paces away.

The adoption of the M1856 rifle musket had effectively rearmed the Russian army with modernized weaponry. The M1856 was easy to use because it was as simple as a standard smoothbore musket, but it had an increased firing range and improved accuracy. In 1858, a directive was made to rearm all Russian corps with the new rifle.

In 1859, a new directive was made to provide the M1856 to the Cossack armies and the Caucasian armies of the Russian Empire. As a result of that directive, a carabine variant of the M1856 was made. The M1856, and its variants, were effectively used by the Russian army in the Caucasian War.

A ramrod with a swelled profile and a tulip-shaped head featuring a torque hole, closely mirroring the Austrian counterpart found on the M1854 Lorenz rifle musket. It featured a stock made from stained birch, which is naturally pale but can closely mimic the grain pattern of Prussian beech, commonly used in Central European military long arms.

== Use ==
The rifle was developed in 1856 and adopted into service in 1858. The rifle's adoption and service fell into the period between the end of the Crimean War and the beginning of the Russo-Turkish War of 1877-78. During that period of time, the Russian Empire was not involved in any major European conflict. Despite being quickly replaced by breechloading rifles, the M1856 rifle musket was used during several wars and campaigns.

=== Caucasian War ===
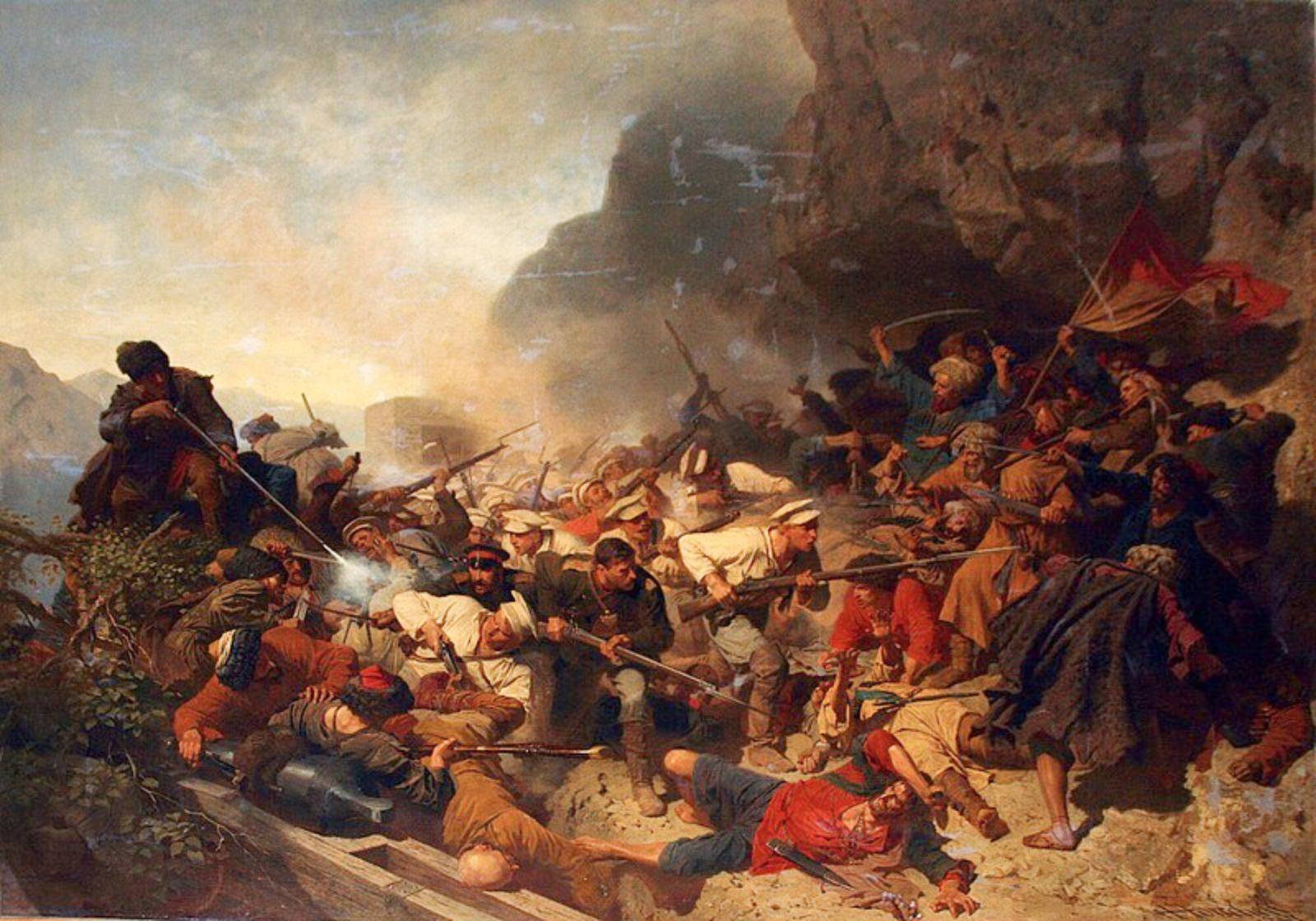
Russian soldiers storming fortifications during the Siege of Ghunib. The Russian soldiers are depicted with the M1856 six-line rifle musket. The M1856 can be identified by the caplock mechanism.

The M1856 musket rifle was used in the final campaigns of the Caucasian War. The rifle was issued to infantry, cavalry, and Cossack detachments. It was effectively used in the final battles of the war. Including the Siege of Ghunib and the Narzan uprising.

=== Russian conquest of Central Asia ===
The M1856 was distributed to the frontiers of the Russian Empire. It was used in several battles and campaigns in Turkestan before being replaced with breechloading rifles such as the Terry-Norman rifle, the Carle rifle, the Krnka rifle, and the Berdan rifle. The M1856 was used in the Turkestan campaigns before being replaced in 1868.

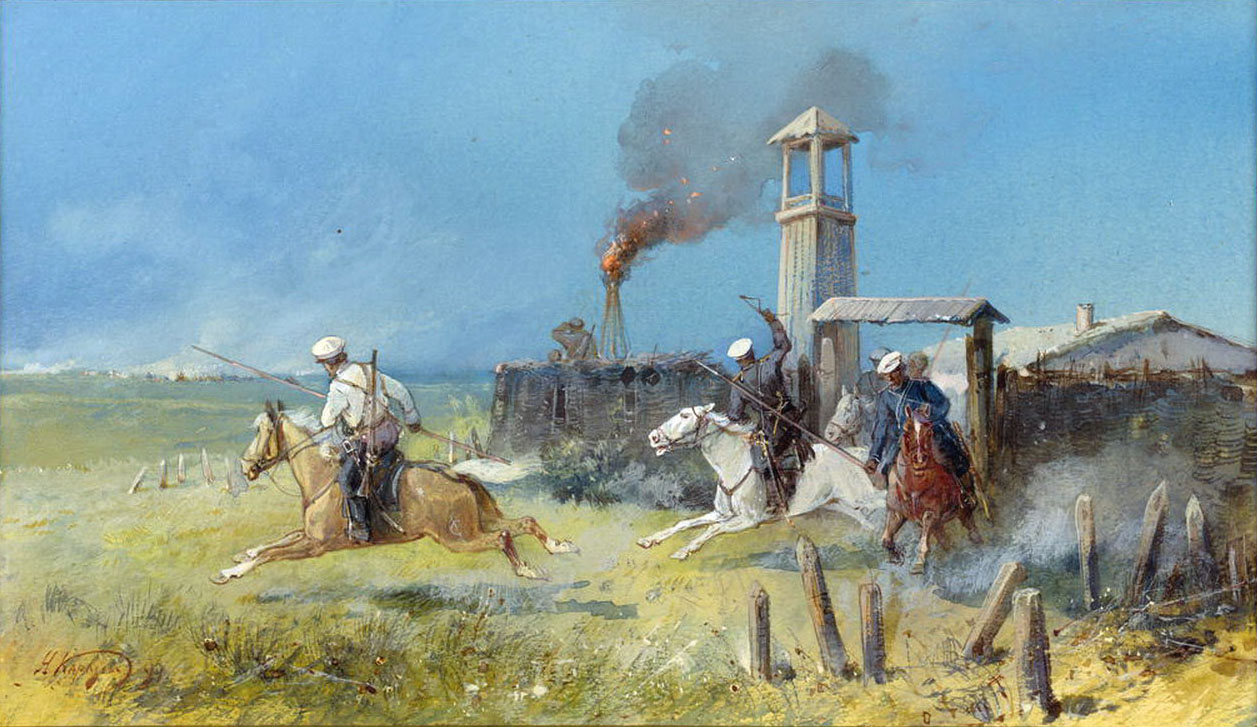
Battle of Uzynagash. October, 1860. One of the battles where the M1856 rifle musket was used.

The M1856 was used in the Battle of Uzynagash. During that battle, the M1856 rifle musket outclassed the firearms and artillery of the Kokand tribesmen and it provided the Russian army with superior firepower.

The M1856 also saw action in the following battles and sieges:

- Battle of Ican 1864
- Siege of Tashkent 1865
- Siege of Khujand 1866
- Battle of Irjar 1866

=== January Uprising ===
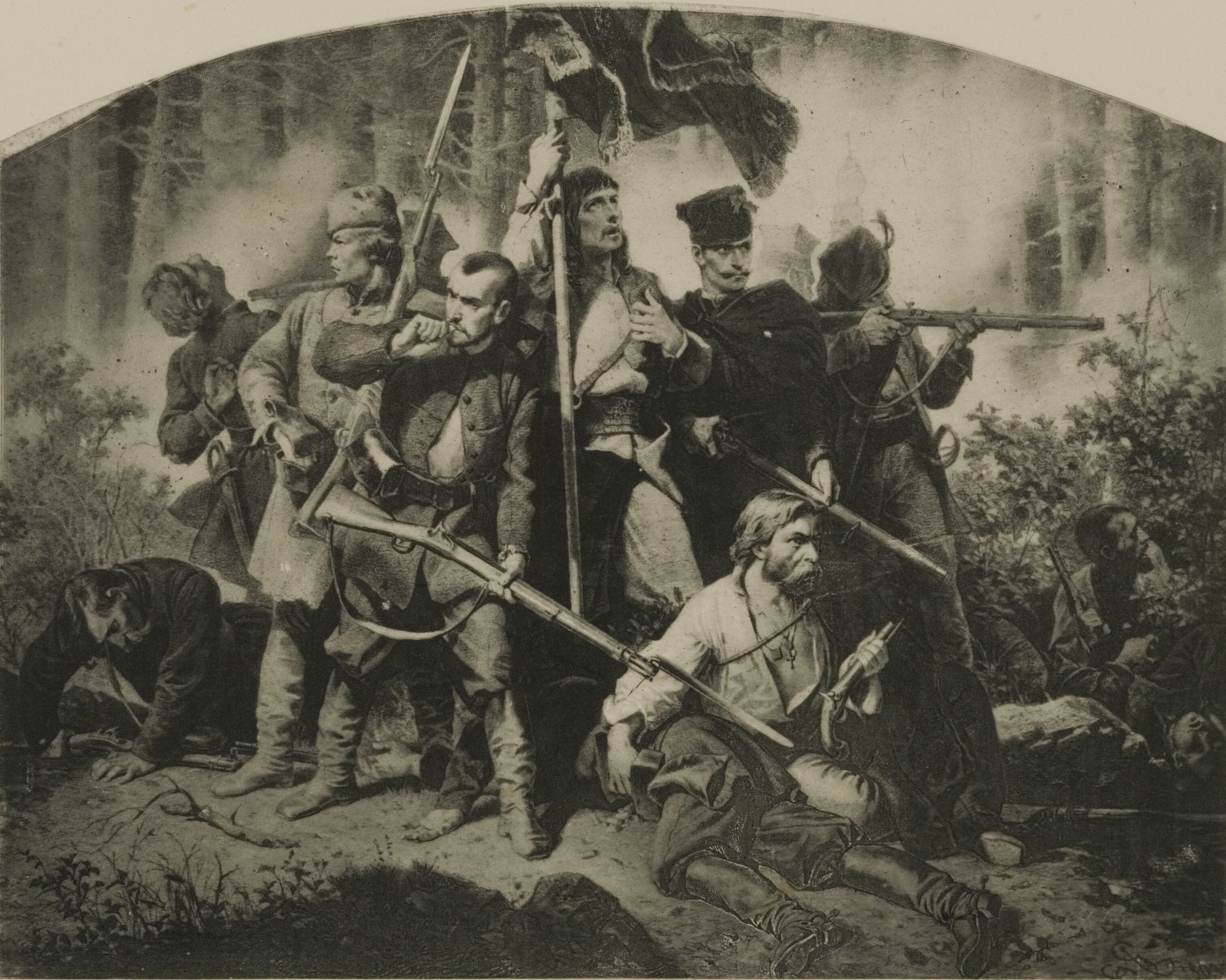
A battle from the January Uprising. The men are depicted with the M1856 rifle musket. It can be identified by the caplock mechanism.

The January Uprising took place between 1863 and 1864. During that period of time, the Russian army was armed with the M1856 rifle musket. It was used by both sides in the conflict.

=== Seinan War ===
The Satsuma forces under Saigō Takamori, utilized the M1857 rifle-musket during the rebellion.

== Variants ==
Chernolikhovka refers to a short Cossack variant of Russia’s 6-line muzzle-loading rifles developed in the late 1850s with the help of anonymous Belgian gunsmiths and gunsmiths from the Line Army, closely related to the M1859 Cossack rifle. Production was intended for the Caucasian Cossack forces, with plans for 12,000 rifles, 500 rifles for the Plastun, and another 2,610 manufactured in Belgium; however, the Cossack rifles were not converted to the later Krnka breech-loading system, unlike other 6-line rifles.

== Replacement and recycling ==
Despite effectively rearming the Russian army following the defeat in the Crimean War, the M1856 quickly became an outdated weapon due to the development of breechloading rifles in Western countries. Early examples of breechloading rifles include the Dreyse needle gun in the Kingdom of Prussia and the Sharps rifle in the United States.

In order to rearm its army with breechloading rifles, the Russian Empire sought reuse and recycle the muzzle-loading M1856 rifles and convert them into breechloaders similar to how Pattern 1853 Enfield was converted into the Snider-Enfield or how Springfield Model 1861 was converted into Springfield Model 1873.

The Main Artillery Directorate of the Russian Empire spent several years searching for and testing mechanisms to convert muzzle-loading rifles into breechloaders.

The M1856 rifle musket was converted into the following breechloading rifles:

- Gillet-Trummer rifle - A small number of those rifles were made because it was not adopted into service.
- Terry-Norman rifle - About 62 000 rifled muskets were converted into the Terry-Norman rifle. It was quickly replaced due to its outdated caplock mechanism.
- Carle rifle - A more successful rifle design that fired a fully integrated paper cartridge. A total of 213 000 to 215 000 rifled muskets were converted into the Carle rifle. The Carle rifle was successfully used in the Conquest of Central Asia and the Russo-Turkish War.
- Krnka rifle - A more modernized rifle design by Sylvester Krnka. The rifle fired fully integrated metallic cartridges. About 790 000 to 800 000 rifled muskets were converted into the Krnka rifle. It was a successful rifle that was used the Conquest of Central Asia, the Russo-Turkish War, the Russo-Japanese War, the Balkan Wars, and it even saw limited use in World War I.
