= Battle of Uzynagash =

1860 battle of the Russo-Kokand War

- Part of the Russo-Kokand War
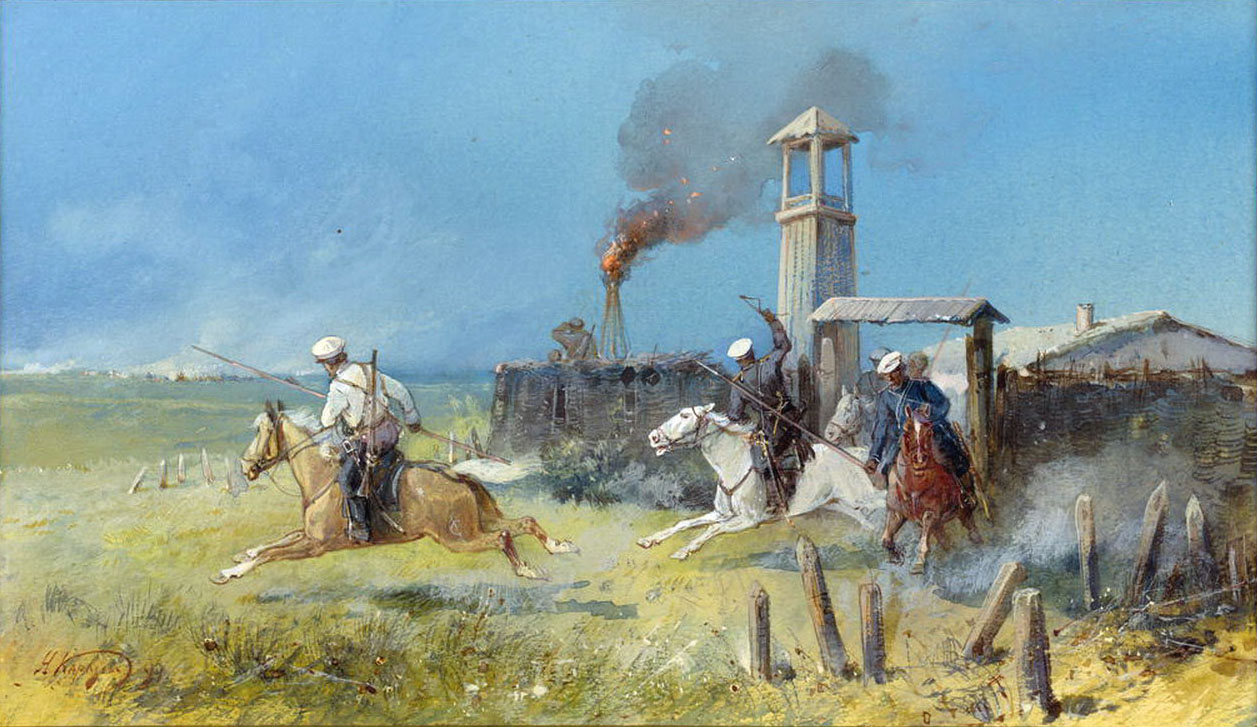
- Cossacks repel the attack
Date	19–21 October, 1860
Location	Uzynagash, Russian Empire (Modern day Kazakhstan)
Result	Russian victory
Territorial changes	Russians annexed Semirechye

Belligerents
Russian Empire	Khanate of Kokand

Commanders and leaders
(Russian Empire) Gerasim Kolpakovsky	(Khanate of Kokand) Shabdan Baatyr

Strength
1,700–2,150; 4 guns	16,000

Casualties and losses
1 killed 26 wounded	150 killed or wounded

The Battle of Uzynagash (Russian: Узун-Агачское сражение) was a series of engagements fought in October 1860 during a campaign of the Khanate of Kokand against Russian forces in Semirechye. The campaign ended in a Russian victory.

== Early contacts ==
In the early 1850s, the Russians slowly advanced into Semirechye, which caused discontent among the population, local Kazakhs began to en masse to serve the Kokand Khanate, which was gathering forces to re-invade the region, after the failure in 1853.

== Background ==
In October 1860, the Kokand invaded Semerechye, the number of this army was from 16 to 20 thousand, the Russian forces were dispersed throughout the regions, and there was a possibility of destroying them separately. Several hundred Cossacks everywhere, fighting off enemy forces, flocked to the picket of Uzun-Agach, and the Kokand people also arrived.

== Battle ==
=== 19 October ===
Several Kokand soldiers directly attacked the Russian picket without waiting for reinforcments, but the grapeshot artillery fire and musket fire inflicted heavy losses on them and they were forced to retreat.

In this engagement, the Russian army was armed with the M1856 six-line rifle musket. The M1856 rifle musket had a longer firing range and increased accuracy. In Uzunagash, the M1856 outclassed the firearms and artillery of the Kokand forces and it provided the outnumbered Russian army with superior firepower.

During the entire day, small detachments of Russian reinforcements arrived to Uzunagash. A notable skirmish occurred when one detachment of 60 Cossacks managed to break through enemy encirlement and make it safely to Uzunagash with only three men being wounded.

=== 20 October ===
On the morning of 20th October, the Kokand army received reinforcement. With additional reinforcements, the Kokand army decided to attack in another way, but this attempt was also unsuccessful because it was repelled with artillery grapeshot and rifle fire. After the unsuccessful attack, the Kokand army resorted to exchanging fire from a distance. At noon, lieutenant colonel Gerasim Kolpakovsky received news about the attack. He immediately moved out towards Uzunagash with 250 men, 5 cannons, and 2 rocket launchers. The reinforcements arrived to Uzunagash by the evening.

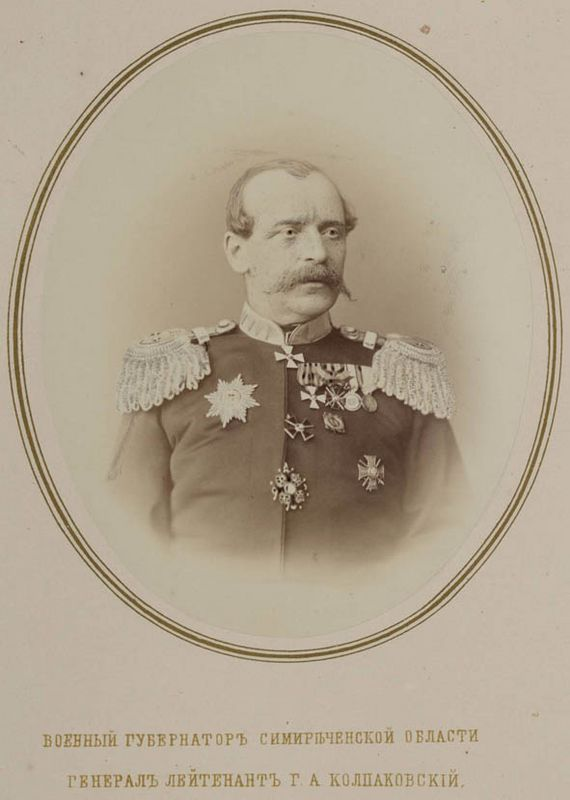
Gerasim Kolpakovsky. Commander of the Russian army at the Battle of Uzunagash.

The Kokand army, having failed to take Uzunagash, retreated westward and broke camp on a hill located about 5-6 km from Uzunagash. During the night, Kolpakovsky began organizing for an attack. Kolpakovsky left the picket with 600 men, 6 cannons, and 2 rocket launchers. At Uzunagash, Kolpakovsky left a total of 75 infantry, 25 Cossacks, and one cannon to guard the picket.

=== 21 October ===
Kolpakovsky decided to enter the northern flank of the Kokand army and strike at the dominant heights.

At 4:00 A.M., Kolpakovsky's army neared the Kokand army. The Russian artillery, being escorted by Cossacks, was moved out to the front positions to open fire. The Kokand army saw that the Russian artillery was exposed at the front so the Kokand soldiers decided to attack it. However, the attack was quickly repelled by grapeshot. The Russian artillery was also protected by Cossacks and by one company of infantry. As the Kokand attack was repelled, the commander of the Russian artillery ordered for one cannon and one rocket launcher to be placed on top of a steep sopka. The sopka's position opened a larger firing line that allowed the two pieces of artillery to fire at the retreating Kokand forces. Kolpakovsky decided to pursue the retreating soldiers and he ordered for his army to cross the Kara-Kastek river.

At the same time, additional Kokand forces arrived at Uzunagash. Kolpakovsky's army was outnumbered in the open field; however, Kolpakovsky managed to effectively reorganize his small army such that it was capable of defending from all sides.

The Kokand ambushed and attacked Kolpakovsky's rear guard that consisted of one company of infantry. The Kokand soldiers along with their cavalry successfully surprised the Russian infantry and they pushed the Russians back against a riverbank. The company commander quickly ordered his men to create a linear formation and he used the river to protect his rear. The single company of infantry held back the Kokand soldiers until Kolpakovsky sent reinforcements. The rearguard was quickly reinforced with 100 Cossacks, one cannon, and one rocket launcher. Together with the reinforcements, the Russian infantry repelled the Kokand attack.

The Kokand attack provided Kolpakovsky with intel on where the bulk of the Kokand army was. Kolpakovsky reformed his army towards the bulk of the Kokand soldiers and he made preparations for an assault. The Russian artillery was located in the centre with infantry and Cossack detachments being positioned on the flanks. After barraging the Kokand positions with artillery, Kolpakovsky's army performed a frontal assault. The entire army, along with artillery, advanced uphill towards the Kokand positions. Two of the Russian cannons became stuck in the mud and could not be advanced further. As the Russian army advanced, the Kokand forces attempted to attack the flanks. The counter-attack was repelled with accurate and deadly rifle fire.

After advancing onto the hill, the Russian artillery opened fire at close range. Big masses of soldiers were barraged and effectively defeated. Having failed to overrun the Russian army, and being beaten back by Kolpakovsky, the Kokand army retreated from the battlefield. The Russian army, having fought a numerically superior enemy force for nine hours, was too tired to pursuit the Kokand soldiers. Kolpakovsky's army spent the rest of the day marching between different outposts, replenishing ammunition supplies, and evacuating the wounded to a hospital in Kastek. The army returned to Uzunagash late at night. In the end, Kolpakovsky's army had marched 46 km and fought a nine-hour battle.

The Kokand army lost up to 1,500 people - including at least 350 killed. The losses of the Russian army were 1 killed and 26 wounded. In addition to those casualties, six Russians had contusions - including Kolpakovsky.

== Aftermath ==
As a result of a victory against a numerically superior Kokand army, many of the Russian soldiers and officers were awarded and promoted. By the order of Alexander II, Gerasim Kolpakovsky was promoted to a colonel and he received a 4th Class Order of Saint George.

Russian sources say that this is one of the most important battles of Russian conquest of Central Asia. It was a battle that took place during a fragile period of Russian conquest. In 1860, the Russian Imperial Army had a small presence in the region and they were not as technologically superior as they would be in later campaigns. The Russians did not have any railroads or telegraphs in the region. The Russian army was also using muzzleloading rifled muskets - the Russian army started using breechloading rifles in 1867.

With all difficulties accounted for, the possibility of a defeat was highly likely. If the Russian army was defeated at Uzunagash, they could have lost the entire region. The Russian victory at Uzunagash effectively secured the Semirechye and Almaty regions for the Russian Empire. Those regions would serve as lodgements for the Russian Army in future campaign.
