= Carle rifle =

Russian needle rifle

- Type: Needle-gun
- Place of origin: Kingdom of Prussia; Russian Empire

Service history
- In service: 1867–1886
- Used by: Russian Empire
- Wars: Russian conquest of Central Asia; Russo-Turkish War

Production history
- Designer: Johannes Friedrich Christian Carle
- Designed: 1865
- Developed from: M1856 muzzle-loading rifled musket
- Produced: 1867–1869
- No. built: 213 000~215 000

Specifications
- Length: 1845 mm (with bayonet); 1320 mm (without bayonet)
- Cartridge: 15,24 mm integrated paper cartridge
- Caliber: 15,24 mm
- Action: Breechloading bolt action
- Rate of fire: 8-12 rounds per minute
- Muzzle velocity: 305 m/s
- Feed system: Single-shot

The Carle rifle, also known as Carle's rifle or Carl's rifle, is a Russian breech-loading needle rifle that was developed in 1867.

The rifle was designed by Johannes Friedrich Christian Carle in 1865. The Carle rifle was designed to reuse and recycle old muzzle-loading rifled muskets in the arsenal and convert them into breechloaders. This rifle, among other rifles, was a part of the Russian modernization process that took place following the defeat in the Crimean War.

Although the Carle rifle was quickly replaced with more advanced rifles such as the Krnka rifle and eventually the Berdan rifle, more than 200 000 Carle rifles were produced. The Carle rifle saw military action on various frontiers including Russian conquest of Central Asia and the Russo-Turkish War of 1877-1878.

== Background ==
During the Crimean War the majority of Russian infantry was armed with smoothbore muskets. The smoothbore muskets would prove themselves disadvantageous against the rifled muskets of the allied forces. That difference in firearms would be noticed on many battlefields of the war such as Alma or Inkerman.

Following Russia's defeat in the war, tsar Alexander II would pass a series of reforms. Among those reforms was a military reform that sought to reform and to modernize the Russian army.

One step towards modernizing the Russian army was to adopt more modernized weapons. The army imported foreign revolvers such as Smith & Wesson, Colt 1851, Beaumont-Adams, and Lefaucheux to rearm its officers.

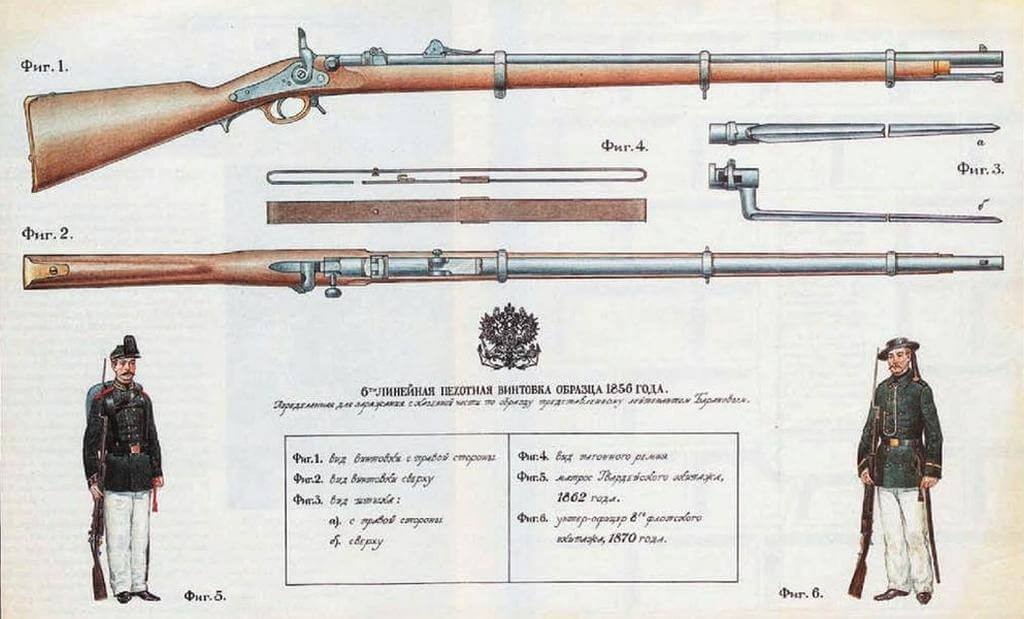
A drawing of the Russian M1856 muzzle-loading rifled musket. These rifled muskets would later be recycled and converted into breechloading rifles - including the Carle rifle and the Krnka rifle.

In order to rearm the infantry, the arms plants within the Russian Empire started manufacturing rifled muskets. The M1856 rifle was a muzzle-loading rifle that was fit with a percussion cap mechanism. The M1856 rifle was chambered with a 15,24 mm calibre - often referred to as the 'six-line' in Russian. It had a length of 1340 mm with a barrel length of 939 mm. It weighed 4.4 kg. The rifled was designed to be loaded with 4,78 g of gunpowder and the bullet weighed 35,19 g. The M1856 had a muzzle velocity of 348 m/s.

The M1856 rifle would be produced from 1856 up until the mid 1860s. The production of the M1856 had effectively rearmed the Russian infantry with a modernized firearm; however, by that time new forms of firearms were emerging in Western countries.

By the late 1840s and early 1850s, breech-loading rifles were becoming more common in Western countries. Early examples include the Dreyse needle gun in the Kingdom of Prussia and the Sharps rifle in the United States.

Breech-loading rifles demonstrated their effectiveness during the Second Schleswig War when the Danish army, armed with muzzle-loading rifles, was overwhelmed by the Prussian army that was armed with rapid firing Dreyse rifles. Following Prussia's victory in the war, many European countries, including the Russian Empire, recognized the importance of rearming their armies with breechloading rifles.

The task of developing a modern breechloading rifle for the Russian army was handled to Main Artillery Directorate.

Due to the low levels of industrialization in the Russian Empire, the Russian arms plants could not switch to manufacturing original breechloading rifles. To solve that shortcoming, the Main Artillery Directorate sought reuse and recycle the muzzle-loading M1856 rifles. The plan was to find an efficient design that could replace the breech of a muzzle-loading rifle with a breechloading mechanism.

During the process of finding an efficient design, the Main Artillery Directorate tested out dozens of original mechanisms and they tested dozens of foreign rifles. Among the foreign rifles, the Dreyse needle gun was the most popular.

== Early Russian Breechloaders ==
=== Gillet-Trummer rifle ===
Among the dozens of original breechloading mechanisms that were presented to the Main Artillery Directorate one was presented by a Belgian gunsmith Gillet. His design was improved by Trummer. Hence, giving the rifle its name of Gillet-Trummer. Although their mechanism had certain advantages that won it some popularity, the Gillet-Trummer rifle was not accepted.

=== Terry-Norman rifle ===
One of the more successful rifles was the Terry-Norman rifle. The original mechanism was designed by an English gunsmith Terry. His designed was improved by gunsmith Norman, a Russian gunsmith from Tula. Due to their shared contribution, the rifle was presented as the Terry-Norman rifle.

The Terry-Norman rifle featured a simple rotating bolt mechanism that allowed one to load the rifle from the breech. However, the Terry-Norman mechanism retained the percussion cap mechanism from the M1856 rifle. That retention allowed the rifle to be cost-efficient and easy for manufacture. Unfortunately, it also decreased the rifle's rate of fire because the retained percussion cap mechanism required one to manually change the percussion cap before firing the next shot. As a result of that shortcoming, the rate of fire for the Terry-Norman rifle was only 5-6 rounds per minute. In comparison, other rifles such as Chassepot or Dreyse needle gun had a rate of fire of 8-12 rounds per minute. In some aspects, the Terry-Norman rifle was similar to the earlier models of the American Sharps rifle.

Despite the shortcomings, the Terry-Norman rifle was briefly adopted and manufactured. About 62 000 Terry-Norman rifles were made. Despite having an outdated mechanism, the Terry-Norman rifle was used in various frontier wars and the Russo-Turkish War of 1877-78.

According to Fedorov, the Terry-Norman rifle was adopted to test out the manufacturing abilities of Russian arms plants. It was done so that the Main Artillery Directorate could now for sure if Russian arms plants are capable of manufacturing breechloading rifles.

Following the brief adoption of the Terry-Norman rifle, the Main Artillery Directorate sought to find a design of a breechloading needle rifle that could fire integrated paper cartridges.

Among the dozens of proposed designs, one design would be the design of Johannes Friedrich Christian Carle.

== Carle rifle ==
=== Design history ===
Following the Austro-Prussian War and the Battle of Königgrätz, in which the superiority of Dreyse needle guns demonstrated itself in the highest extent, the Imperial Russian Army switched its attention towards arming its soldiers with a similar needle rifle. Therefore, the Terry-Norman rifle would cease production and the Russian Army focused on finding a needle rifle design to convert its old M1856 rifles into a modern firearm.

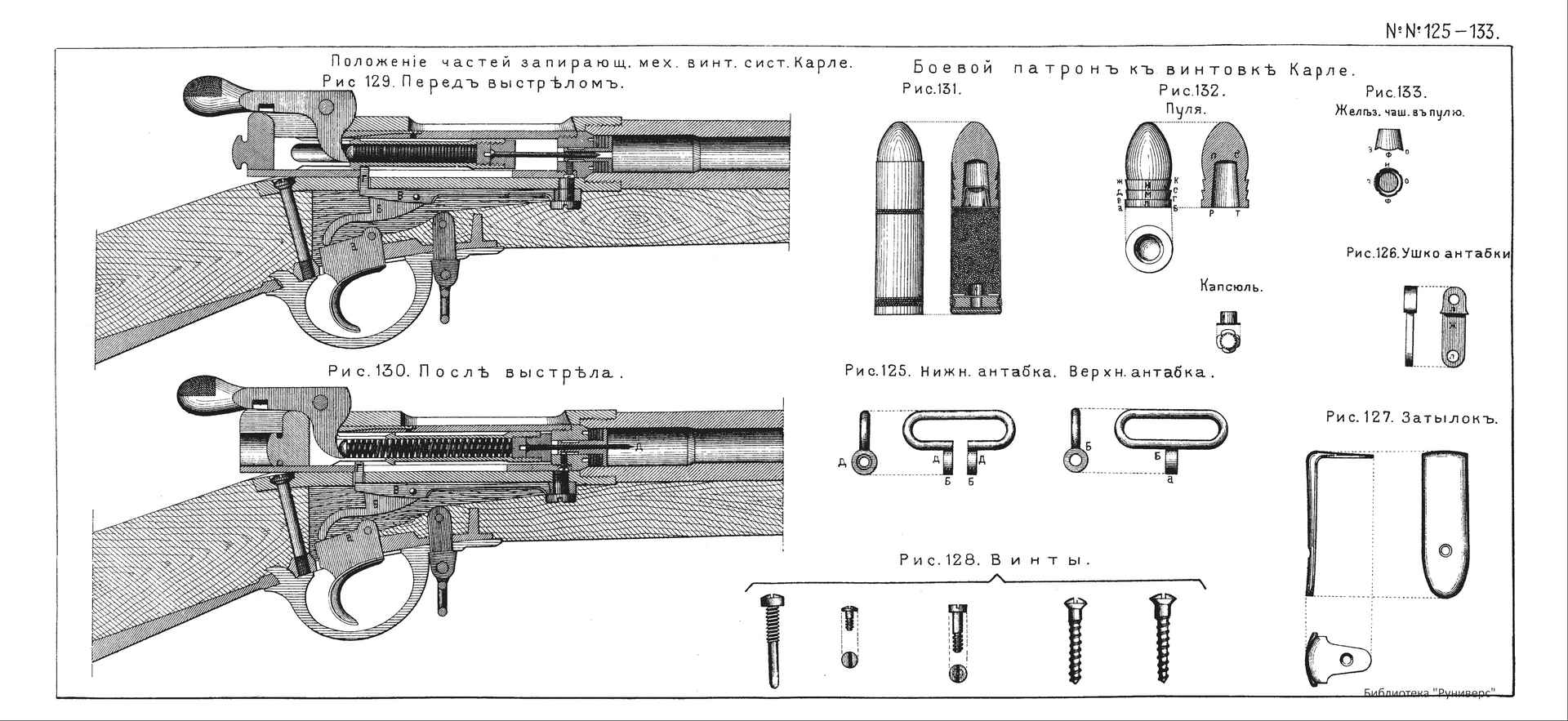
Mechanism of the Carle rifle. Top left illustration depicts the needle mechanism before firing. Lower left illustration depicts the needle mechanism after firing.

Johannes Friedrich Christian Carle, along with his helper Zons, designed an original needle gun breech system in the city of Hamburg. A Russian artillery officer, Nikolai Ivanovich Chagin, was traveling abroad in search of rifle designs. Chagin received an order from Saint Petersburg to inspect the design of Carle and Zons. Upon inspection, Chagin found their design to be satisfactory and worthy of further testing. Carle and Zons were tasked with converting an M1856 rifle into a breechloading rifle. They successfully converted the rifle into a breechloader; however, the final result was not as satisfactory. Neither Carle or Zons could travel to the Russian Empire in order to finalize their rifle. As a result, Russian gunsmiths, under the management of Chagin, would work on finalizing the rifle. After modifying the rifle, a small test was conducted. The modified rifle was used to fire 1800 rounds of ammunition. Having passed the preliminary testing, the rifle was adopted into service on March 28, 1867. The rifle would be labeled as a 'Six-line needle rifle.' None of the designers names were mentioned while the rifle was manufactured.

=== Manufacturing ===
When the rifle was first launched into production, a series of issues appeared. Those issues included issues with the cartridge chamber, frequent misfires, the paper cartridges, and the chamber clogging - the chamber would be clogged with unburnt remains of used cartridges. As a result, Russian arms manufacturers would spend several months modifying the cartridge chamber and testing out different cartridges. The Carle rifle was finalized by autumn of 1867.

The mass manufacturing of the Carle rifle started in 1868. However, a lot of Russian arms manufacturers were poorly equipped for the task. The manufacturers would fail to meet the manufacturing goals. The Carle rifle was also manufactured by private Russian gunmakers. Despite the difficulties in the manufacturing process, between 213 000 and 215 000 rifles were made.

The following video depicts how the Carle rifle bolt is operated .

=== Disadvantages and replacement ===
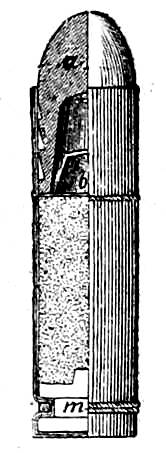
The fully integrated paper cartridge of the Carle rifle.

One of the key disadvantages of the Carle rifle was the paper cartridge. Although the cartridge was a fully integrated cartridge, it had several disadvantages. The paper cartridge was fragile and it could be easily broken if one was not careful with it. Paper cartridges had a short longevity. The paper cartridges were also sensitive to water and they became defective if they were soaked. Finally, the paper cartridge would cause issues that affected the rifle's performance. Sometimes, the fired cartridge would not entirely incinerate. The unburnt remains would clog the loading chamber and the rifle's barrel. That issue would affect the rifle's ballistic performance. With a clogged barrel, the next shot would usually have a lower muzzle velocity and a decreased effective firing range.

The solution to those issues was a more modern cartridge with a metallic casing.

The Main Artillery Directorate turned its attention towards finding a new rifle that would use a metallic cartridge. Among the proposed designs, there were the Albini-Baranov rifle, Berdan I rifle, and the M1867 Krnka rifle.

In the end, the Krnka rifle was adopted to convert the remaining M1856 rifles.

In 1870, the Berdan II rifle was adopted as a new service rifle for production. The Berdan II was chambered with the 10.75×58mmR cartridge - an entirely different cartridge. The Berdan rifle would be produced up until it was replaced by the Mosin-Nagant. More than 3 million Berdan rifles were made.

== Use ==
The rifle was adopted into service in 1867. The rifle's adoption fell into the period between the end of the Crimean War and the beginning of the Russo-Turkish War of 1877-78. During that period of time, the Russian Empire was not involved in any major European conflict. In addition to that, the decades-long Caucasian War ended in 1864. Therefore, the Carle rifle did not see any action in that conflict. Despite being taken into service during a period of serenity, the Carle rifle did see action during several wars and campaigns.

=== Russian conquest of Central Asia ===
According to the opinion of the minister of war Dmitry Milyutin, from the book by Fedorov, the Carle rifles were redistributed among the frontiers of the Russian Empire. Those included the military districts of Turkestan, West Siberia, East Siberia, Orenburg, and the Caucasus.

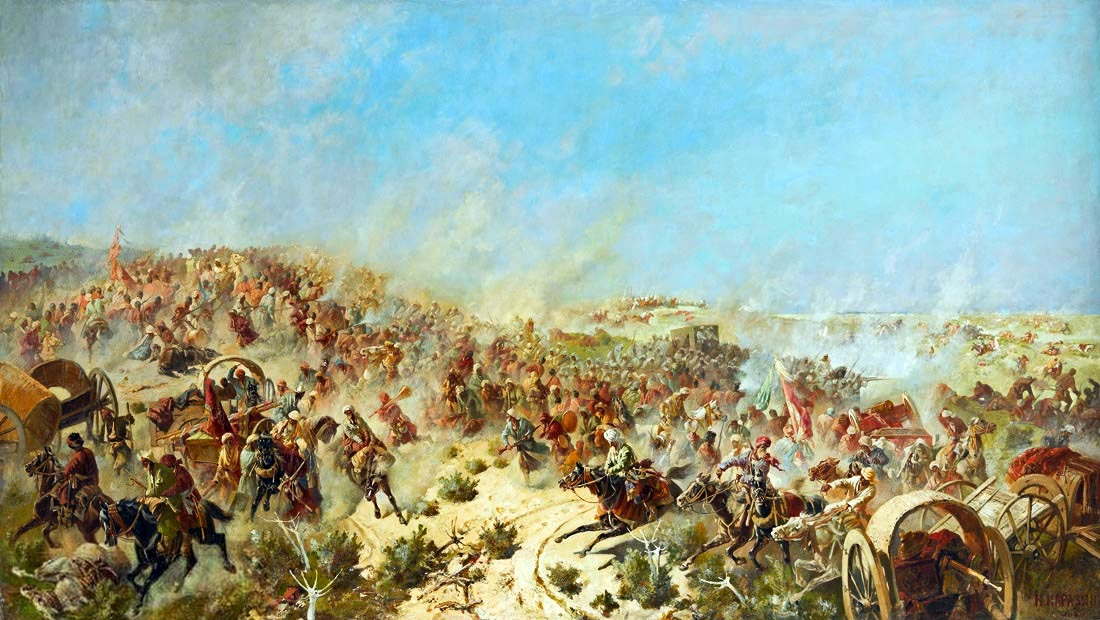
Battle of Zerabulak. June, 1868. This battle was the first time that the Carle rifle was used in action.

The Carle rifle was first used during the 1868 Bukhara campaign; the 1868 campaign was the final stage of the Russian conquest of Bukhara. The Carle rifle played an important role in the Battle of Zerabulak. Although greatly outnumbered on the battlefield, the Russian army had superior firepower. The rapid firing rifles gave the Russian infantry an advantage both when defending and when attacking.

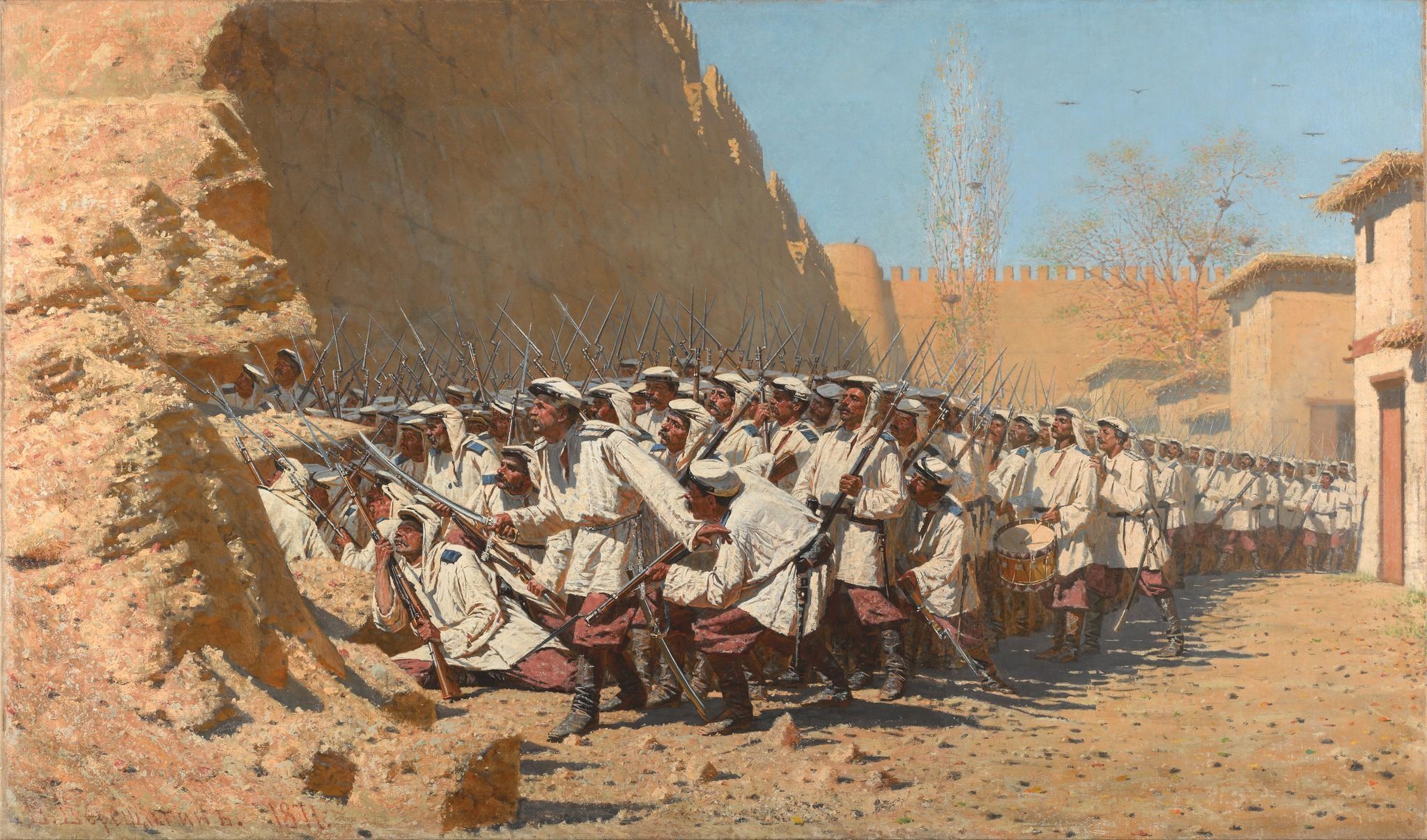
An episode from the Siege of Samarkand. June, 1868. The outnumbered Russian garrison was armed with Carle rifles.

Parallel to the Battle of Zerabulak, Carle rifles were also used by the Russians during the Siege of Samarkand. The greatly outnumbered Russian garrison was equipped with the rapid firing rifles when they were defending against the massive besieging army.

Even after the adoption of more advanced rifles such as the Krnka rifle and the Berdan rifle, some of the Turkestan battalions continued to use the Carle rifle. The Carle rifle would be used in the later campaigns. Including the Kuldzhin campaign of 1871, the Khivan campaign of 1873, the 1875-76 campaign against the Khanate of Kokand, the 1879 Battle of Goek Tepe, and the second Battle of Goek Tepe.

=== Russo-Turkish War of 1877-1878 ===
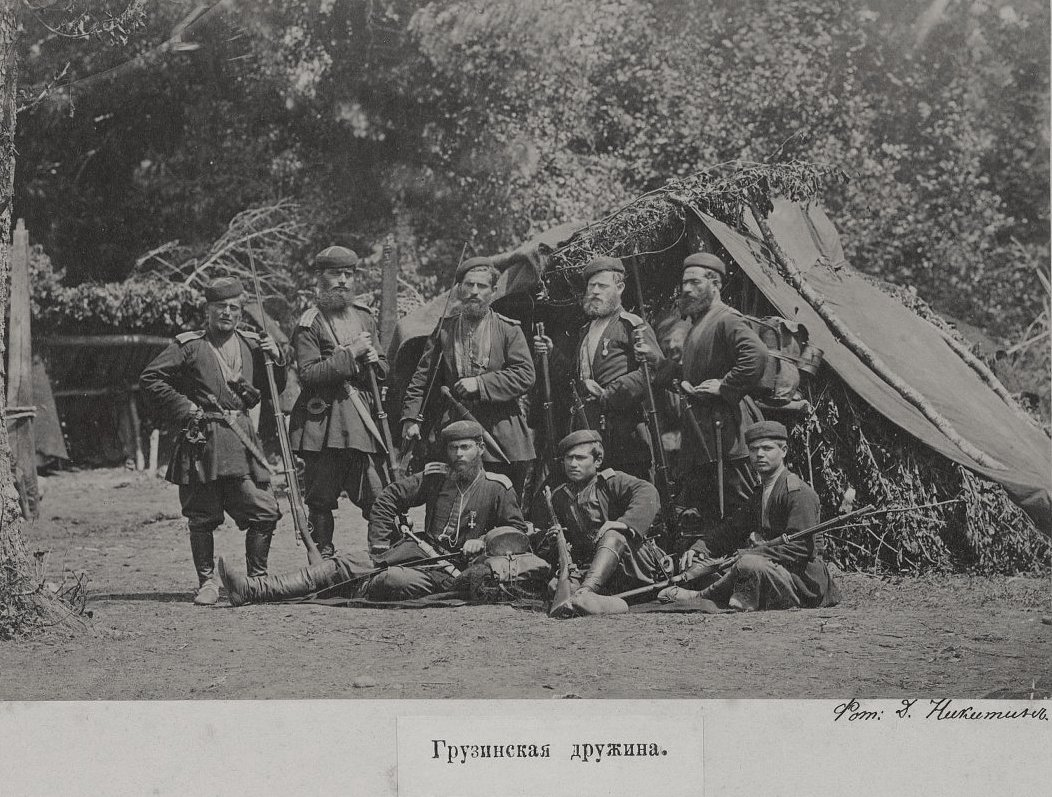
A squad of Georgian soldiers in the Caucasian theatre of the Russo-Turkish War of 1877-78. The soldiers pose with Carle rifles. The Carle rifles can be identified by the distinctive bolt at the end of the breech.

By the start of the war, most of the Russian army was armed with modern rifles - including Krnka and Berdan. Regardless, the Carle rifle was also used in the war. Despite the rifle's disadvantages, it was still a rapid firing breechloading rifle that could fire up to 10 rounds per minute.

The Carle rifle was more prominent in the Caucasian theatre of the war. The soldiers of the Caucasian theatre of the Russo-Turkish War of 1877-78 were armed with the Carle rifle. It is estimated that around 151 000 Carle rifles were used in the war.

=== Later use ===
Peace in Europe was established following the end of the war and the Congress of Berlin. Besides being used in Central Asia, the Carle rifle would also be used as rifle for big-game hunting.
