= Rifled musket =

Type of firearm

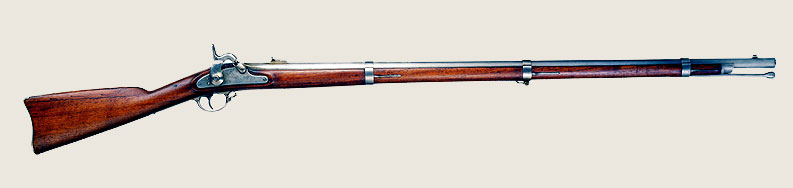
Springfield Model 1861 rifle musket

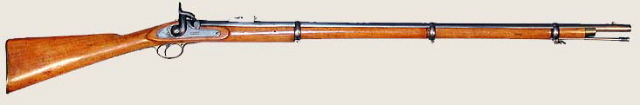
Pattern 1853 Enfield rifle musket

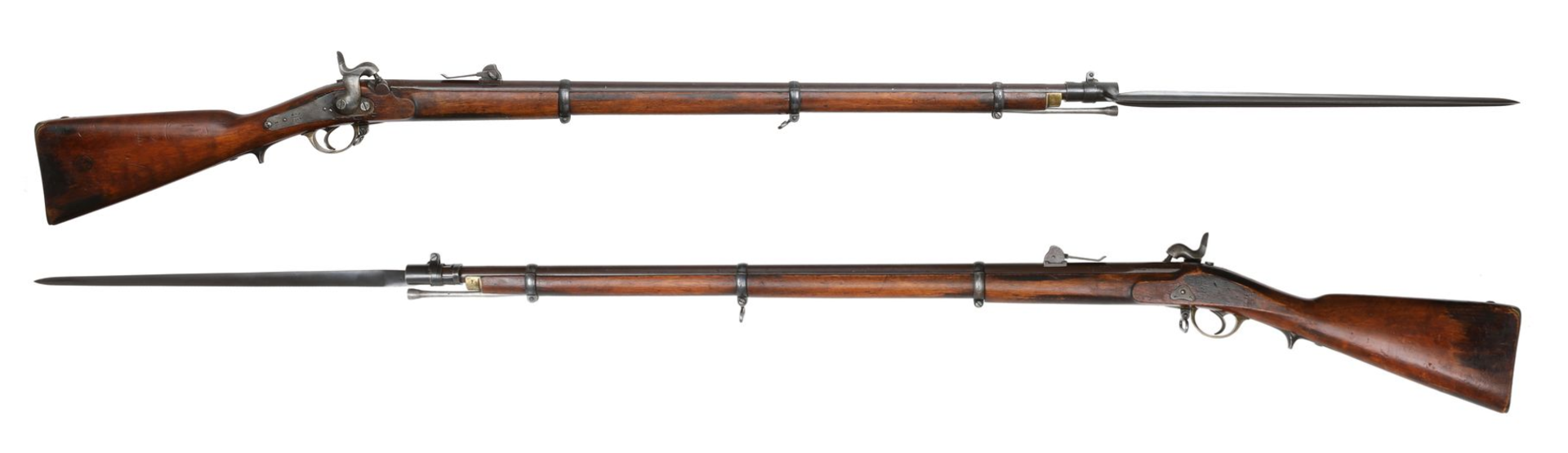
The Russian M1856 six-line rifle musket with a bayonet

A rifled musket, rifle musket, or rifle-musket is a type of firearm made mid-19th century. Originally the term referred only to muskets that had been produced as a smoothbore weapon and later had their barrels replaced with rifled barrels. The term later included rifles that directly replaced, and were of the same design overall as, a particular model of smoothbore musket.

== History and development ==
In the early 19th century, both rifles and muskets were in use. Muskets were smoothbore muzzle-loading weapons, firing round lead balls or buck and ball ammunition, that were also designed to accept a bayonet. Rifles were similar in that they used the same kind of flintlock or caplock firing mechanism, but the main difference was that their barrels were rifled – that is, their barrels had grooves cut into the interior surface which would cause the bullet to spin as it left the barrel.

Rifles have the advantage of long range accuracy, because spinning bullets have far flatter and more stable trajectories than balls fired from smoothbore muskets. Muskets had the advantage of a faster rate of fire; for example, a trained British soldier could fire three rounds a minute with a musket, while a rifleman would average two. A muzzle-loaded weapon required the bullet to fit snugly into the barrel. For a smoothbore weapon this can be a somewhat loose fit, but in the case of a rifle, the helical rifling lands in the barrel have to cut into the bullet to make it spin. The fit needs to be sufficiently tight for the bullet to engage the lands in order to impart spin; otherwise the bullet will wobble, destroying its accuracy. Furthermore, if the barrel-to-bullet seal is not tight, gases will blow through the rifling grooves and around the bullet, compromising muzzle velocity, accuracy and the bullet's terminal energy at the target. Their greater accuracy and range made rifles ideal for hunting, but the slower rate of fire was a significant impediment for widespread military use, along with the fouling caused by normal firing which made them steadily more difficult to load.

The smoothbore musketeers was the main infantry weapon, while rifles were used only by marksmen and other specialist troops. All muskets were supplied with bayonets, for use in melee combat. At the time, the Russian and French armies actively used light infantry (rangers and voltigeurs), and sometimes scattered whole infantry battalions as skirmishers to fight long-term on rough terrain. Although rifles had better shooting accuracy than smoothbore muskets, their effective fire range was the same. For example, in the British Army, light infantrymen armed with ordinary muskets were trained for 200 to 300 yards (180 to 270 m). Since they were also used as pikes, muskets tended to be fairly long and heavy weapons. They tended to be about 4 to 6 feet (120 to 180 cm) in length (6 to 8 feet (180 to 240 cm), with the bayonet attached), with a weight of around 10 to 12 pounds (4.5 to 5.4 kg), as longer and heavier weapons were found to be too unwieldy. The length of a musket also allowed them to be fired by ranks, minimizing the risk that the men in the rear ranks would accidentally shoot the men in the front ranks in the back of the head, or, more likely, scorch their faces and burst their eardrums with the muzzle blast. Muskets 6 feet (180 cm) in length could be fired in three ranks without fear of accidents.

The relative inaccuracy and short range of the musket was not considered to be significant on the battlefield, because smoke from the black powder used at the time quickly obscured the battlefield and rendered the longer range of the rifle useless, especially as a battle progressed.

Rifles were more expensive to make than muskets, and were typically used by small units of specialized riflemen trained not to fight in closed ranks, but in open order, spread out as either skirmishers or sharpshooters. Since they were not fired over other men’s shoulders or designed for close-combat bayonet fighting, military rifles could be much shorter than muskets, which also made loading from the muzzle easier and reduced the difficulties associated with fitting the bullet into the barrel, although the rate of fire was still slower than that of a musket.

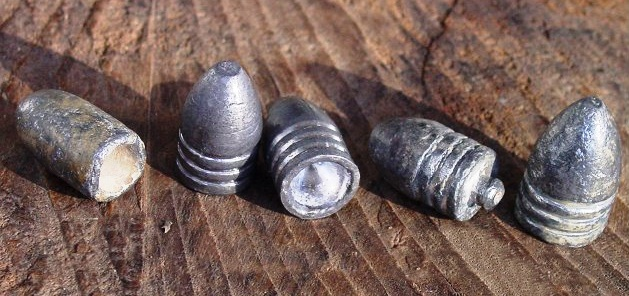
Various rifled musket projectiles

The problem of slow loading of rifles caused by barrel fouling was solved by the Minié ball, which was invented in 1846 by French inventor Claude-Étienne Minié. Despite its name, the Minié ball was not a round ball at all, as it had a long conical shape with an expanding skirt at the rear of the projectile. The skirt allowed the minié ball to be smaller than the barrel's bore, so it would slip in as easily as the ball of a smoothbore. When the weapon was fired, the skirt expanded to fit tightly against the inside of the rifle barrel, with less energy wasted in blow-by around the projectile and ensuring that the rifling lands and grooves would impart a stabilizing spin to the minié ball.

In the 1840s and 1850s, many smoothbore muskets had their barrels replaced with similar barrels that were rifled so that they could fire a new type of bullet that greatly enhanced both its accuracy and range. These "rifled muskets" or "rifle muskets" were long enough to serve the function of muskets in close formations of line and square, were as quick to load as the old muskets and as easy to use with minimal training. Yet the Minié-type rifled muskets were much more accurate than smoothbore muskets. Tests of a rifled musket firing Minié ball, and a smoothbore musket firing round ball, at various ranges against a 10 by 10 inches (25 cm × 25 cm) target, showed much higher accuracy for the rifled musket. From a smooth-bore musket, from 42% to 48% of bullets hit the target at a distance of 200 yards. At a distance of 300 yards, 18% of the bullets hit the target. For a rifle, the results were much better. From a rifle, 46% to 58% of bullets hit the target at a distance of 300 yards; 24% to 42% at 500 yards. This potential accuracy, however, required skills only acquired through advanced training and practice; a rifled musket in the hands of a raw recruit would not have performed very much better than a smoothbore, and may have performed worse due to its lower muzzle velocity and greater drop with range. Nevertheless, the musket was still a formidable force on the battlefield. At the beginning of the American Civil War, some infantry regiments chose to keep smooth-bore muskets, preferring them because they could shoot "buck and ball" and while other models are capable of firing slug-style projectiles, this unit utilizes the Nessler ball.

In the 1860s and 1870s, newer weapons were produced with rifled barrels, but were still being referred to as "rifled muskets" or "rifle-muskets" even though they had not originally been produced with smoothbore barrels. The term was only used for weapons that directly replaced smoothbore muskets. For example, the Springfield Model 1861 with its percussion lock mechanism and long barrel was called a "rifled musket". In contrast, early breech-loading metallic cartridge rifles such as the Henry repeating rifle and the Spencer repeating rifle were produced within the same period, which did not replace the far more common rifled musket, and did not have other musket-like characteristics, and was just referred to as a "rifle".

By the 1880s and 1890s, rifled muskets were made largely obsolete by single-shot breech-loading rifles and bolt-action repeating rifles, such as the M1867 Werndl–Holub, Springfield Model 1873, Mauser Model 1893, and Springfield Model 1892–99. A significant number of the single-shot breech-loading rifles were produced by simply changing out the percussion lock mechanism of a rifled musket. However, once this change was made, the weapon was no longer referred to as a rifled-musket and was instead referred to as simply a "rifle".

== Characteristics of rifled muskets ==
In general, rifle muskets were the same length as the smoothbore muskets they replaced. This meant that they typically had a barrel length of about 40 inches (100 cm) and an overall length of about 55 to 60 inches (140 to 150 cm). Period U.S. Armory nomenclature described rifles and rifle-muskets as newly made firearms specifically designed and manufactured with rifling. Rifled muskets were smoothbore firearms returned to the armory or contractors for rifling. Considerable numbers of armory-stored smoothbores were converted in this way in the 1850s upon adoption of the Minié ball as the standard projectile. Rifle muskets tended to be of smaller caliber than their smoothbore predecessors, for example, the .58 caliber U.S. Springfield Model 1855 or the .577 caliber British Pattern 1853 Enfield. Tests conducted by the U.S. Army in the mid-1850s showed that the smaller caliber was more accurate at longer ranges. The cylindro-conical shape of the Minié ball also meant that the smaller-diameter but longer .58 caliber Minié ball had roughly the same amount of lead and weight as the larger .69 round ball. While the caliber was reduced, the overall length of the barrel was not. Shorter rifles could have easily been made (and were made for specific branches or arms such as mounted infantry and riflemen) that would have been more accurate than the smoothbore muskets they replaced, but military commanders still used tactics like firing by ranks, and feared that with a shorter weapon the soldiers in the rear ranks might accidentally shoot the front rank soldiers in the back of the head. Military commanders at the time also believed that bayonet fighting would continue to be important in battles, which also influenced the decision to retain existing barrel lengths.

In the US and British service standardized infantry firearms were produced in a longer "rifle musket" version and a shorter "rifle" version, such as the Springfield Model 1855. The rifle musket version had a 40-inch barrel and an overall length of 56 inches (140 cm). The rifle version had a 33-inch (84 cm) barrel and an overall length of 49 inches (120 cm). In the British forces the distinction was retained between the full-length musket issued to the infantry as a whole, and the shorter and handier version of the Enfield produced for specialist rifle regiments and marines. The long version had the barrel held to the stock by three metal bands, while the shorter version needed just two, so they are referred to as “3-band” and “2-band” Enfields respectively.

Rifle muskets typically used percussion lock systems, with some exceptions like the Springfield Model 1855, which also was equipped with the Maynard tape primer system.

Since rifle muskets were meant as a direct replacement for smoothbore muskets, they were fitted with bayonets.

In military use, rifle musket loading was simplified somewhat through the use of paper cartridges, which were significantly different from modern metallic cartridges. They typically consisted of rolled-up tubes of paper containing a premeasured amount of black powder and a greased Minié ball. The paper was torn open (typically with the shooter's teeth), the powder was poured down the barrel, the Minié ball was placed into the barrel and rammed down on top of the powder with the ramrod. The paper was then discarded. Also differing from a modern cartridge, a separate percussion cap had to be placed onto the percussion lock's cone before the weapon could be fired. The Maynard tape primer system attempted to speed up this last step by using paper strips similar to those used in modern toy cap guns in place of the percussion cap, but this proved to be unreliable in field service and was abandoned on later weapons.

An exception to this method was the Enfield rifle-musket cartridge. There were no lubrication rings moulded or swaged into the Enfield projectile. The projectile was inserted upside down in the cartridge and the outside of the cartridge paper was greased at the projectile end and intended to be inserted and used as a paper patch. A ramrod was used to fully seat the round.

== Use in battle ==
Rifled muskets were heavily used in the American Civil War. The American-made Springfield Model 1861 was the most widely used weapon in the war, followed by the British Pattern 1853 Enfield. The Lorenz rifle was the third most used rifle during the Civil War Approximately 70% of Confederate forces in the West were initially equipped with smoothbore firearms, such as the Springfield Model 1842. Subsequent surveys conducted later in the war indicated that over 75% of these personnel had transitioned to rifles, predominantly the Enfield model. Cook & Brother established a rifle manufacturing facility at the intersection of Common and Canal streets, initiating the southerners production of copy based on Enfield pattern.

The Enfield was also used in the Crimean War where its greater range provided a significant advantage over the much shorter-ranged Russian smoothbore muskets in certain combat circumstances. Russia try countered with a variant rifle based on the British pattern M1837 Brunswick copy.

In response to the defeat, the Russian Empire developed its own rifled musket - the M1856 six-line rifled musket. The M1856 was used by the Russian army in several conflicts including the January Uprising, the Russian conquest of Central Asia, and the Caucasian War. The M1856 was later recyled into Russian breechloading rifles including the Carle rifle and the Krnka rifle. In the Asian theater, Western colonial powers later used rifled musket in other conflicts like Taiping Civil War, Second Opium War, Indian Rebellion of 1857, and the Herat campaign of 1862–1863. Both Japanese faction import many westerners firearm during the Mito Rebellion and Boshin War.

However, soldiers armed with rifled muskets were not always successful on the battlefield. In the Italian War of 1859, Austrian troops armed with rifled muskets, but insufficiently trained and practiced in their effective use, were defeated by French forces using aggressive skirmishing tactics and rapid bayonet assaults at close range.

Rifled muskets, in conjunction with flintlock mechanisms, saw their final deployment during Second French intervention in Mexico, and the Paraguayan War.

== See also ==
- Muzzle-loading rifle
- Springfield rifle
- Rifle
- Rifling
