= M1867 Russian Krnka =

Obr.1867 Krnka
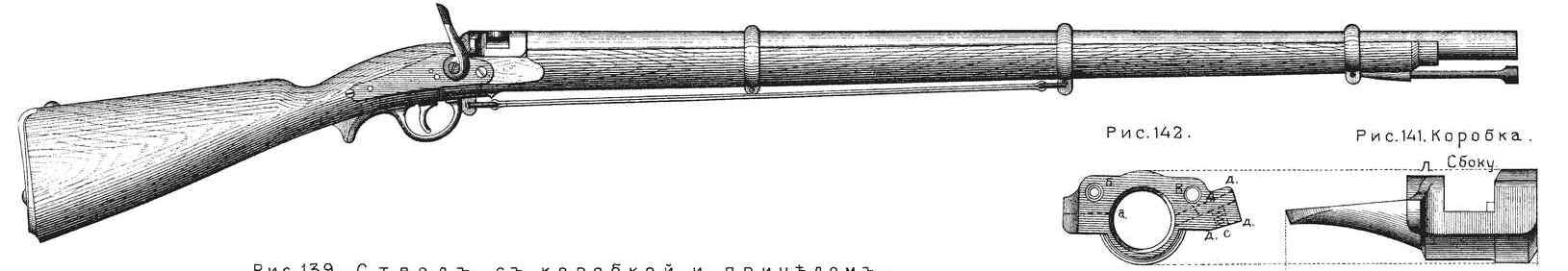
- Drawing of the M1867 Russian Krnka
- Type: Side-hinged lifting Breechblock
- Place of origin: Russia

Service history
- In service: 1869–1880
- Wars: Russo-Turkish War; Russo-Japanese War; Balkan Wars; World War I

Production history
- Designer: Sylvester Krnka
- Designed: 1867
- Manufacturer: Tula Arsenal
- Variants: Infantry, Cavalry

Specifications
- Mass: 4.5 / 4.9 kg / (without / with bayonet)
- Length: 1300 / 1800 mm (without / with bayonet)
- Barrel length: 939 mm (37.0 in); 863 mm (34.0 in) (Dragoon)
- Cartridge: 15.24x40mmR; 20.32×95mmR (M1876 Gana-Krnka)
- Caliber: .60
- Action: Lifting-Block
- Rate of fire: 9 rounds per minute
- Maximum firing range: 600 arshins 1200 arshins (Sharpshooter)
- Feed system: Single shot

The M1867 Russian Krnka (Russian: винтовка Крнка́, romanized: vintovka Krnka) was a breech loading conversion of the muzzle-loading Model 1857 Six Line rifle musket designed by Austro-Hungarian arms maker, Sylvester Krnka.

== History ==
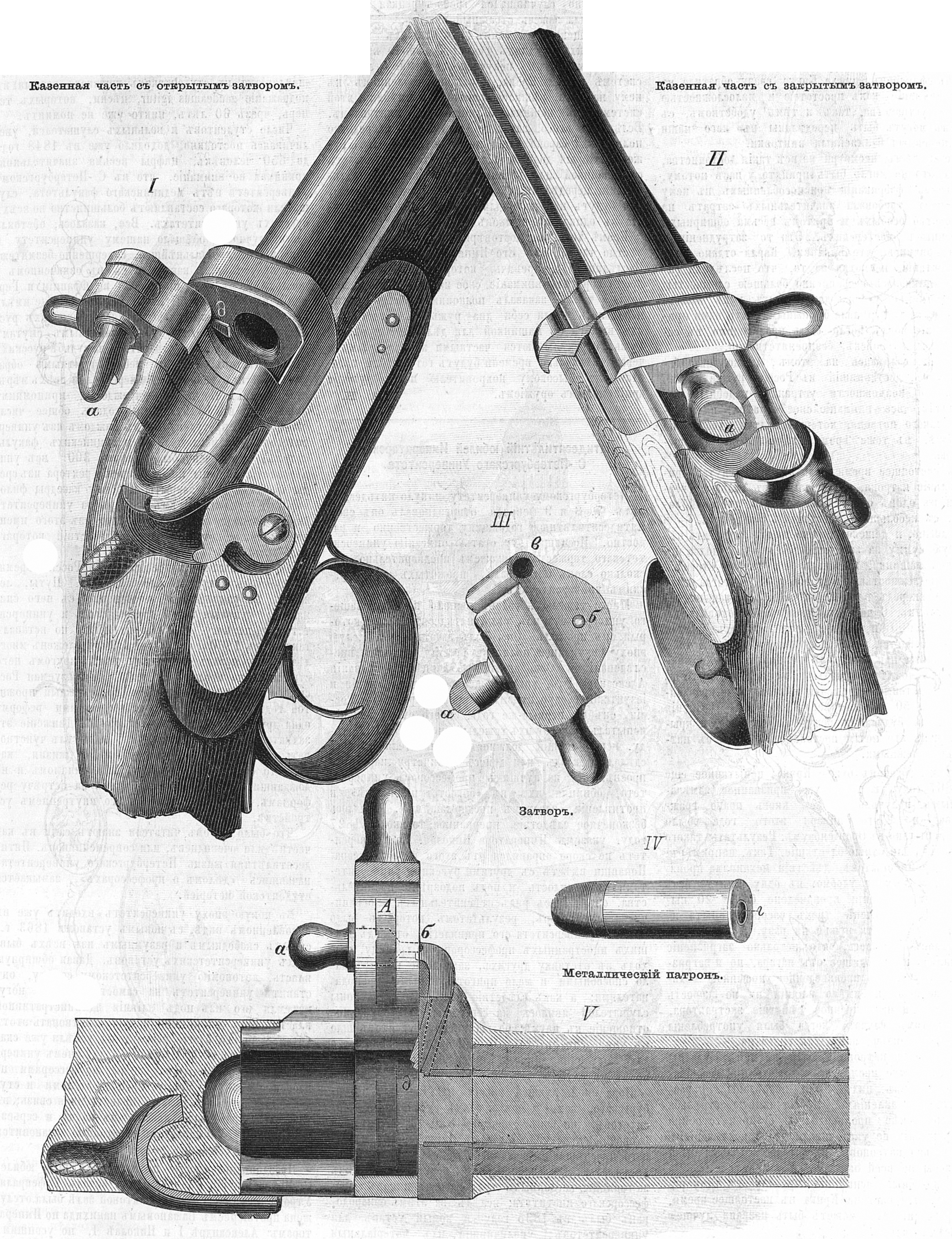
The design of the rifle

On January 11, 1869, Sylvester Krnka brought two copies of his rifle to Russia to compete with the domestic breechloading conversion system of Naval Lieutenant Baranov. By the 30th of March, Czar Alexander II ordered the Krnka conversion rifle of 15.24mm caliber to be adopted by the Russian army. Conversions were carried out at the Tula, Sestroretsk, Kiev, & Izhevsk armories. As well as the private firms of Nobel, Standerscheld, & Meingard. Factories that were producing the Carle needle rifles were then ordered from 1869–1873 to not only produce Krnkas, but convert the Carle's to the Krnka system as well.

== Service ==
Shortly after its adoption, the M1870 Berdan №2 was selected as the main rifle to arm the military. Although the Berdan was meant to replace the Krnka, both weapons would be manufactured simultaneously until the military could be fully equipped with the Berdan in around 1879.

Throughout the Russo-Turkish War (1877–1878), the Krnka remained the most common rifle in Russian service; During the conflict, the Krnka effective range proved to be inferior over the Peabody–Martini and Winchester Model 1866 rifles used by the Turks, which resulted in a large number of casualties into the Russian ranks as their riflemen had difficulty returning fire. After the adoption of the Mosin–Nagant, the rifles were issued to conscripts and police forces in the Central Asian territories, like Samarkand.

After being taken out of service, many Krnka rifles were converted into cheap smoothbore hunting shotguns.

== Variants ==
Three main versions were produced: Infantry, Sharpshooter (стрелковая винтовка), and Dragoon (драгунская винтовка) rifles. The only change made for the Sharpshooter model was the rear sight being graduated to 1200 Arshins. The Dragoon had a shorter barrel, slimmer stock, rounded hammer, and sling mounting holes in the stock.
Montenegro had its own model with an iron receiver rather than the Russian bronze. It also differed in that it was made by converting different Lorenz models with a proprietary cartridge 14.8×35mmR

== Cartridge ==
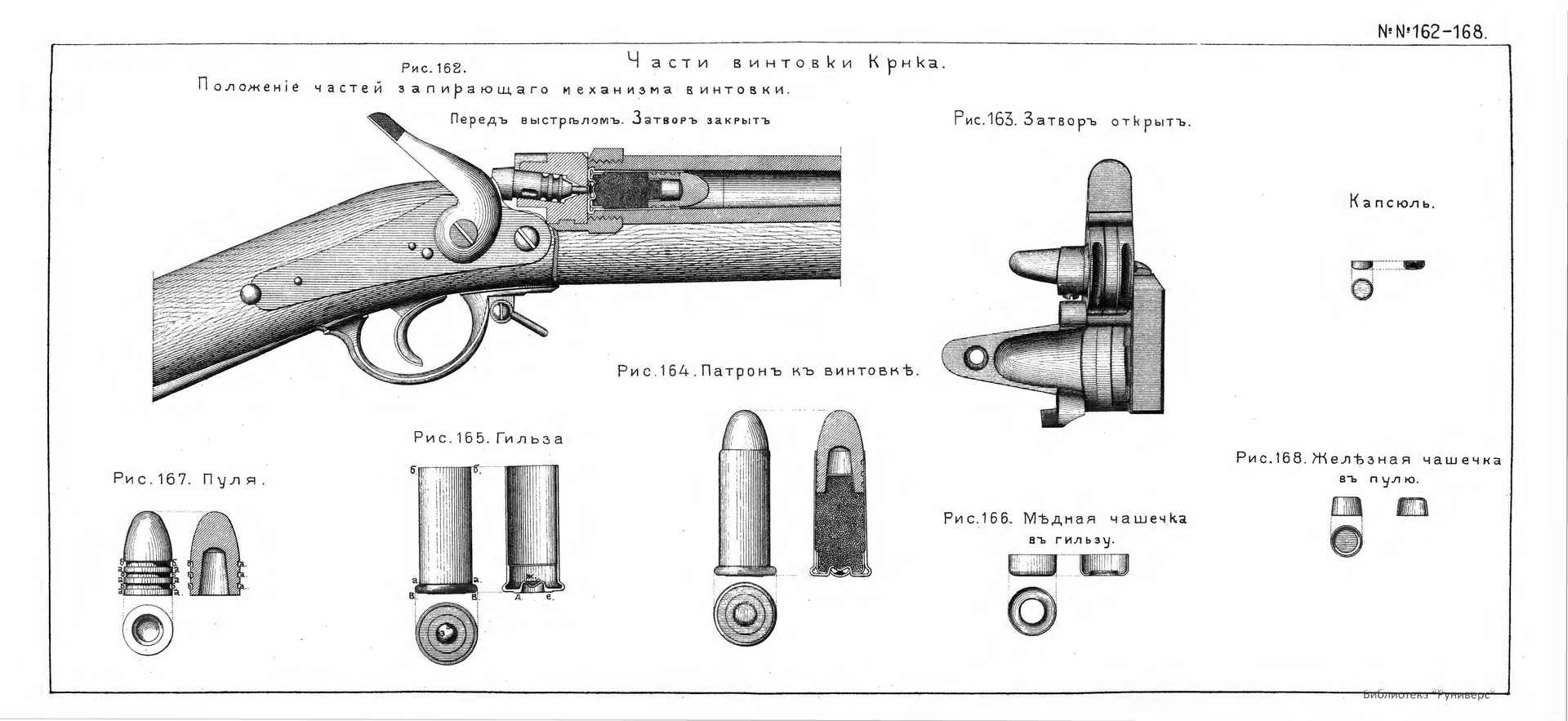
Krnka 6-Line Cartridge

The 15.2x40r cartridge was developed at the production center in St. Petersburg under the direction of Professor I. A. Vishnegradsky. It was the first centerfire cartridge to be mass-produced in Russia. Sylvester Krnka accepted a job at the ammunition plant in St. Petersburg and developed his own cartridge production technology together with Baron Hahn. It consisted of rolled brass sheet pressed into a solid case head. However, in parallel with the development of this production process, the ammunition factory developed a method of producing a drawn brass cartridge case. This method proved to be stronger & economically more advantageous. The bullet had a truncated cone shaped cavity in its base with a metal plug inserted. Upon firing, the plug would drive into the cavity, expanding the bullet, which was slightly oversized to the bore anyway, ensuring a gas tight seal. For his work with the munitions development, Sylvester Krnka was awarded the Knightly Order of St. Stanislaus, 3rd degree.

Ammunition was manufactured by Vasiliestrovsky Munitions Plant (В.Г.О. headstamp) & the Foundry Casting Department of St. Petersburg (Л headstamp). During the Russo-Turkish War, it was discovered that the Krnka could chamber and fire captured Turkish M1874 Peabody-Martini & Snider ammunition. Though accuracy with the M1874 cartridges would have been poor, due to the undersized 11mm bullet passing through a 15mm bore.

== Gallery ==
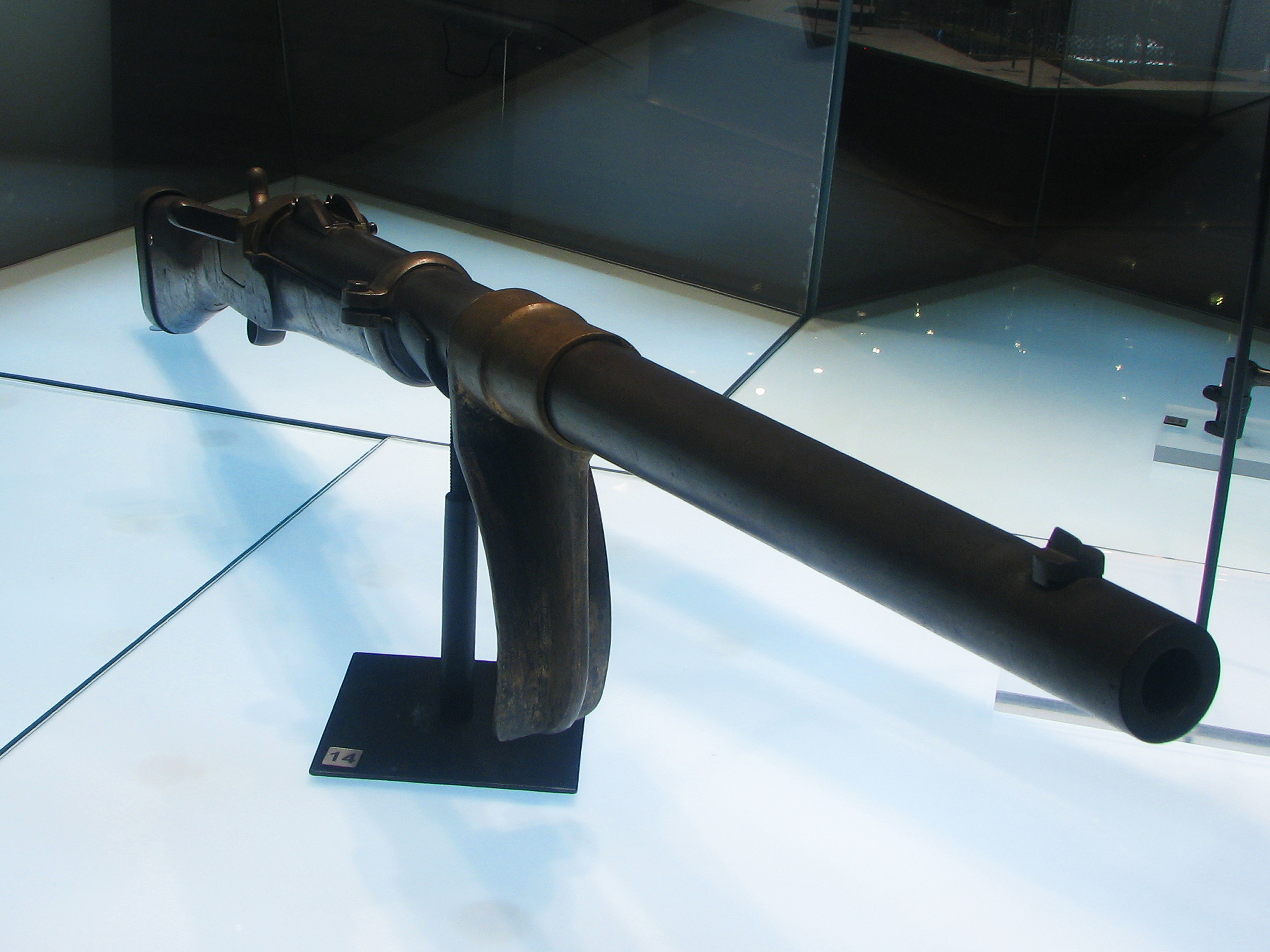
20mm Gana-Krnka rifle conversion in Tula museum

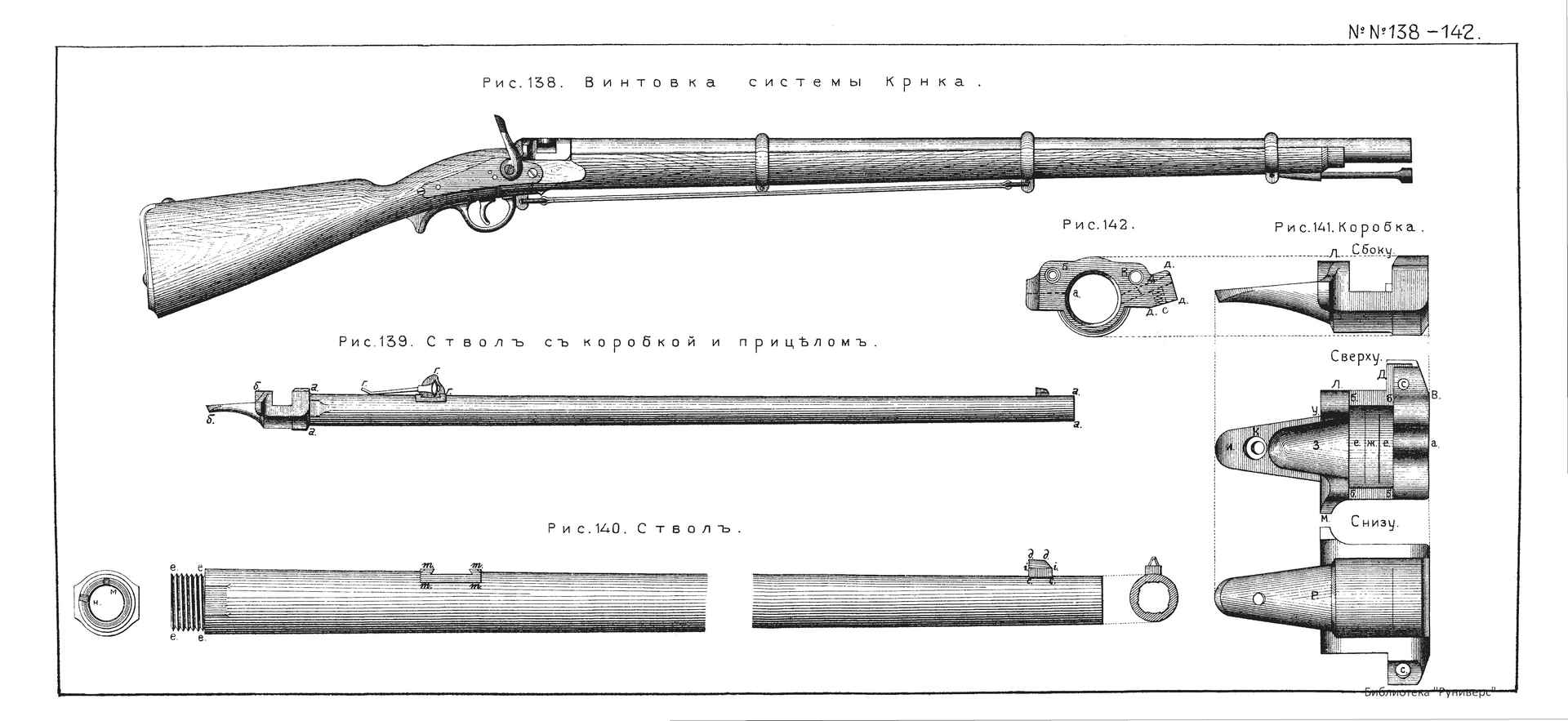
Full drawing featuring the side view

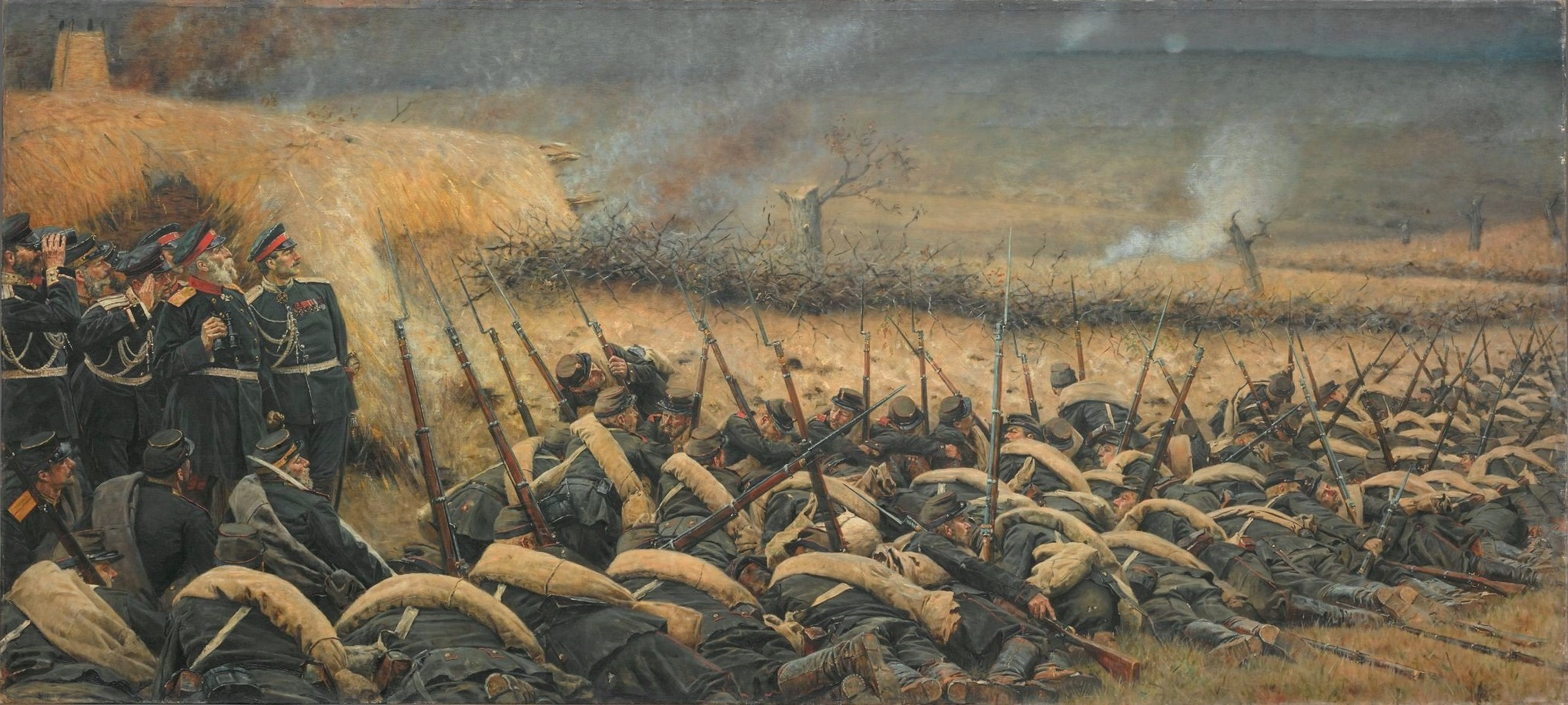
Before the attack at Plevna by Vasily Vereshchagin, featuring Krnka rifles

Krnka rifles in a camp during the Russo-Turkish War

== Users ==
- Russian Empire
- Kingdom of Bulgaria
- Kingdom of Serbia
- Kingdom of Montenegro

== Sources ==
- MilitaryRifles.com: Russian Krnka
