= Dreyse needle gun =

Prussian bolt-action rifle

Dreyse needle-gun
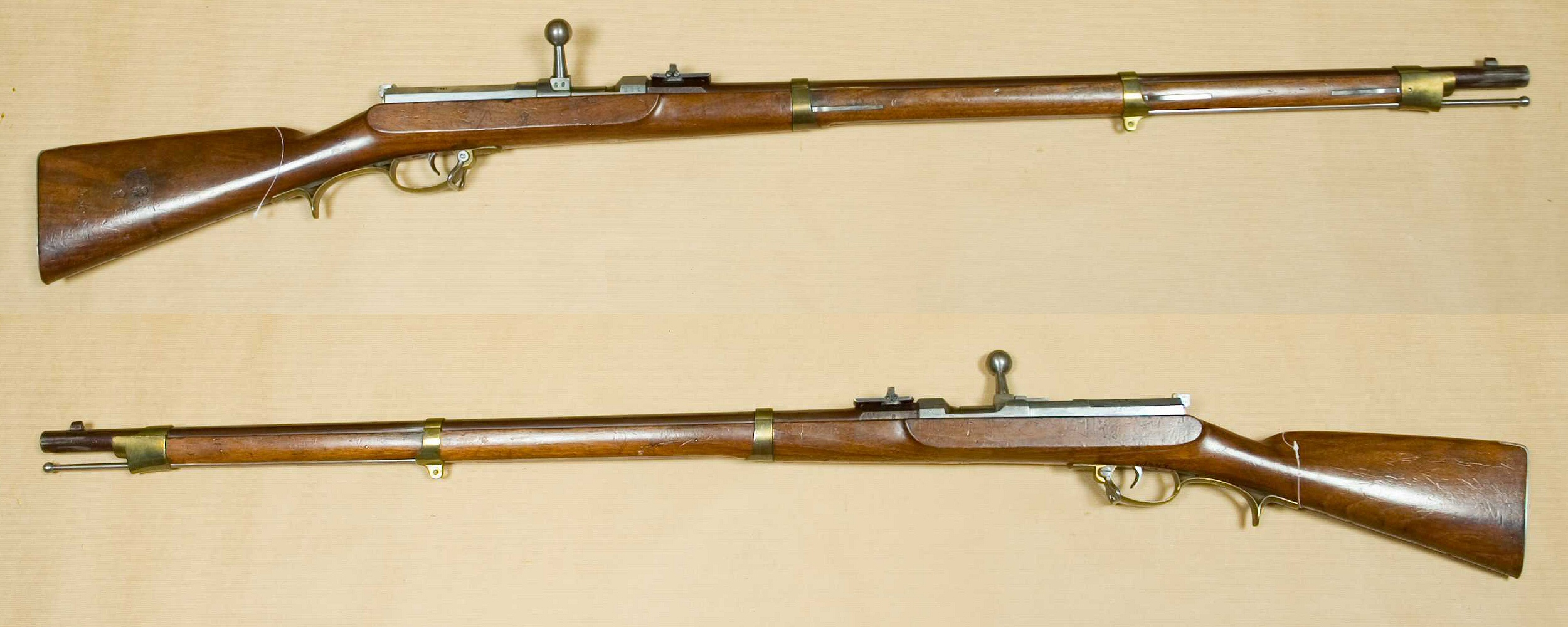
- M-1841 Dreyse needle-gun
- Type: Bolt-action rifle
- Place of origin: Kingdom of Prussia

Service history
- In service: 1841–1876 (Kingdom of Prussia and German Empire)
- Used by: See § Users
- Wars: German revolutions of 1848–49; Taiping Rebellion; Second Schleswig War; Austro-Prussian War; Franco-Prussian war; Dungan Revolt (1862–1877); Paraguayan War; Boshin War (limited); Shizoku anti-revolutionary; Romanian War of Independence; Second Franco-Dahomean War; First Sino-Japanese War

Production history
- Designer: Johann Nikolaus von Dreyse
- Designed: From 1824
- No. built: 1,375,000+
- Variants: Zündnadelgewehr M/41; Zündnadelbüchse M/49; Zündnadelbüchse (Pikenbüchse) M/54; Zündnadelkarabiner M/55 and M/57; Füsiliergewehr M/60; Zündnadelgewehr M/62; Zündnadelbüchse M/65; Zündnadelpioniergewehr U/M (modified model); Zündnadelpioniergewehr M/69

Specifications
- Mass: 4.9 kg (10.8 lb) Zündnadelgewehr M/41; 4.8 kg (10.6 lb) Zündnadelgewehr M/62
- Length: 143 cm (56 in) Zündnadelgewehr M/41; 134 cm (52.8 in) Zündnadelgewehr M/62
- Barrel length: 91 cm (36 in)
- Cartridge: Acorn-shaped lead bullet in paper cartridge
- Caliber: 15.4 mm (0.61 in)
- Action: Breech-loading bolt action
- Rate of fire: ~6 rounds per minute
- Muzzle velocity: 305 m/s (1,000 ft/s) (before Aptierung), 350m/s (aptiert)
- Effective firing range: 200 m (218.7 yd) (point target)
- Maximum firing range: 527 m (576.3 yd) (maximum setting on sights for M/62); 678 m (741.5 yd) (maximum setting on sights for M/65)
- Feed system: Single-shot
- Sights: V-notch and front post iron sights

The Dreyse needle-gun was a 19th-century military breech-loading rifle, as well as the first breech-loading rifle to use a bolt action to open and close the chamber. It was used as the main infantry weapon of the Prussians in the Wars of German Unification. It was invented in 1836 by the German gunsmith Johann Nikolaus von Dreyse (1787–1867), who had been conducting numerous design experiments since 1824.

The name "ignition needle rifle" (German: Zündnadelgewehr) was based on its firing pin, since it passed like a needle through the paper cartridge to strike a percussion cap at the base of the bullet. However, to conceal the revolutionary nature of the design, the rifle entered military service in 1841 as the leichtes Perkussionsgewehr Modell 1841 (transl. Light Percussion Rifle Model 1841). It had a rate of fire of about six rounds per minute.

== History ==
=== Design and development ===
Early versions of the needle gun made by Johann Nikolaus von Dreyse were muzzle-loading. They used a long, needle-shaped firing pin powered by a coiled spring. When the trigger was pulled, the needle pierced the cartridge and struck a percussion cap on the base of the sabot, igniting the charge. Dreyse later combined this ignition system with a bolt-action breech-loading design. This allowed the rifle to be loaded from the rear rather than the muzzle, significantly increasing its rate of fire and making it more practical for military use.

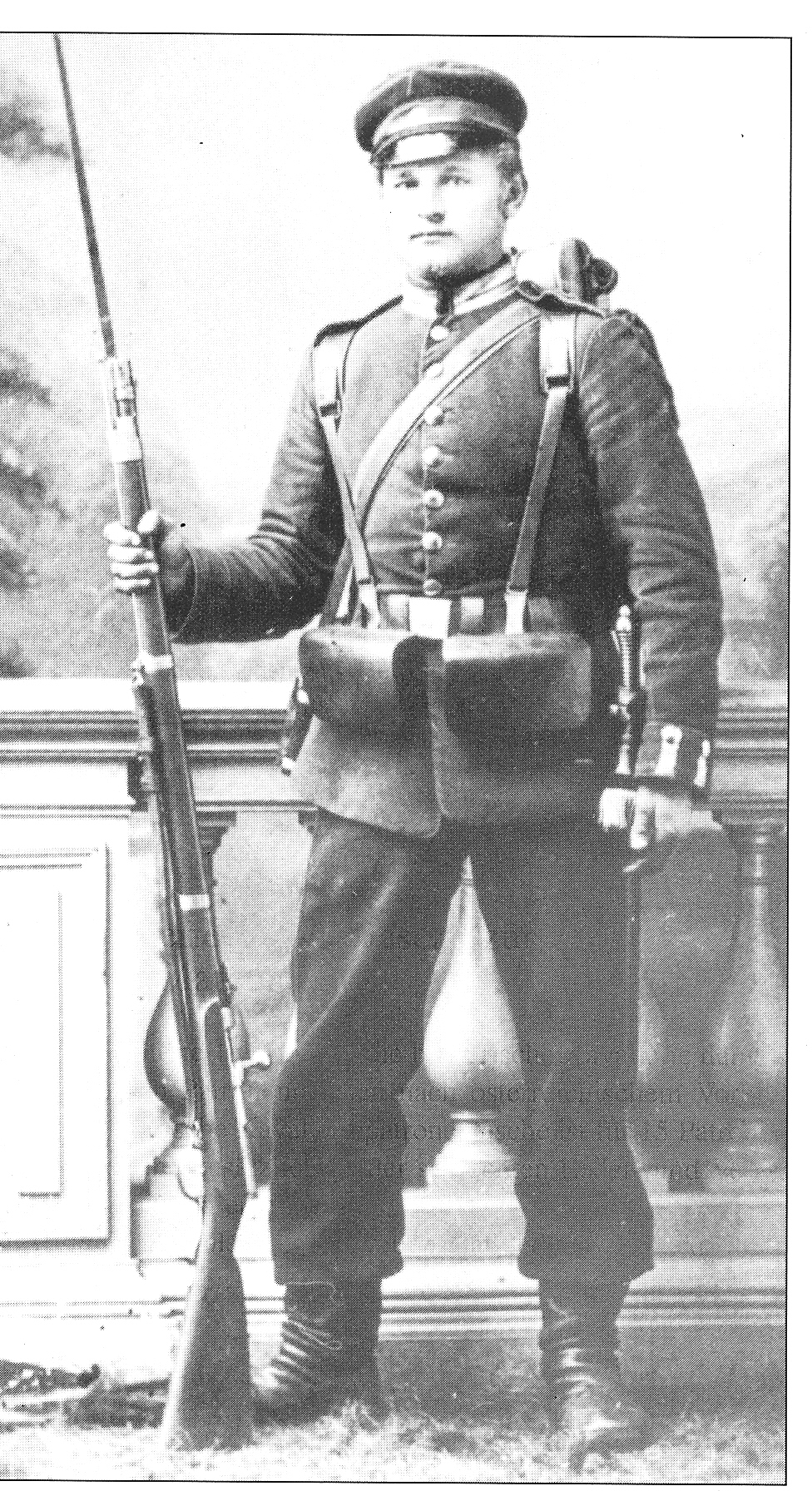
Prussian soldier armed with M1841 Dreyse.

=== Production ===
After successful testing in 1840, the Prussian king Friedrich Wilhelm IV ordered 60,000 of the new rifles. Dreyse set up the Dreyse-Zündnadel factory in Sömmerda with the help of state loans to ramp up production.

It was accepted for service in 1841 as the leichtes Perkussionsgewehr Model 1841, but only 45,000 units had been produced by 1848.

=== Early service ===
The needle gun was used in combat for the first time during the German revolutions of 1848–49 and proved its combat superiority in street fighting during the May Uprising in Dresden in 1849.

Many German states subsequently adopted the weapon, however, the Sömmerda factory could not meet demand and produced only 30,000 rifles a year.

Most of the Prussian infantry in the 1850s were still equipped with the obsolete 1839 Model Potsdam musket, a smoothbore weapon whose range and accuracy was far inferior to the French Minié and Austrian Lorenz rifle. The Prussian Army's low level of funding resulted in just 90 battalions being equipped with the weapon in 1855.

Dreyse consented to state manufacture of the rifle to increase production. The Royal Prussian Rifle Factory at the Spandau Arsenal began production in 1853, followed by Danzig, Saarn and Erfurt. At first, the Spandau factory produced 12,000 Dreyse needle guns a year, rising to 48,000 in 1867.

=== Foreign evaluation ===
The British Army evaluated the Dreyse needle gun in 1849–1851. In the British trials, the Dreyse was shown to be capable of six rounds per minute, and to maintain accuracy at 800–1,200 yards (730–1,100 m). The trials suggested that the Dreyse was "too complicated and delicate" for service use. The royal armed forces developed their own Enfield prototype of the early bolt-action rifle. The rifle showcase by Jonathan Ferguson.

The French carabine à tige muzzle-loading rifle was judged to be a better weapon, and an improved version was adopted as the Pattern 1851 Minié-type muzzle-loading rifle.

American officers wanted the Prussian needle gun because it was one of the most advanced rifles of the 1840s–50s, but Prussia treated it as a closely guarded military secret and refused to export or share copies. During the blockade run in the Civil War, C.S. agent Caleb Huse viewed the needle gun as superior to the French musket but saw it as experimental.

=== Expansion and reform ===
Between 1859 and 1863, the Prussian army received a 25% increase in funding and was reformed by Wilhelm I, Albrecht von Roon and Helmuth von Moltke the Elder.

The Dreyse needle gun played an important role in the Austro-Prussian victory in the Second Schleswig War against Denmark in 1864, though the Prussian line infantry—then largely inexperienced with the Dreyse—often wasted ammunition during the initial phases of the battle, forcing officers to quickly rush in fresh reserves to replace soldiers that emptied their ammunition pouches and leading to criticism from General Friedrich Graf von Wrangel, who considered Moltke's new fire tactics as uncontrollable and dishonorable, while the Austrian General Adolf Schönfeld wrote in early 1866 that during the war in Denmark he "repeatedly overheard Prussian officers worrying about the inability of their men to conserve ammunition for the second, decisive phase of the battle".

In the early 1860s, the introduction of cast steel barrels made industrial mass production of the weapon possible. The new 1862 model and the enhanced M/55 ammunition further accelerated the weapon's widespread adoption. The success of German private industry in delivering the necessary amount of armaments for the army marked the definite end of government-owned army workshops.

By the outbreak of the Austro-Prussian War in 1866, the Prussian Army infantry had 270,000 Dreyse needle guns. While the Dreyse had the advantage of superior rate of fire over the muzzleloading Lorenz—which could fire 1–2 rounds per minute—the Austrians use of inadequate tactics also contributed to their defeat, heavily relying on bayonet charges (Note: During the Second Italian War of Independence the French Army exploited the curved trajectory of the Lorenz rifle, allowing assault groups to engage Austrian lines on melee without taking prohibitive losses; after the war the Austrians neglected marksmanship training in favor of shock tactics.) that effectively negated the superior range and accuracy of the Lorenz, resulting in heavy casualties. According to military historian Geoffrey Wawro, the French Emperor Napoleon III refrained from intervening into the war after the Battle of Königgrätz since his army at the time was also armed with muzzleloaders and used the same shock tactics as the Austrians; consequently the French rushed to adopt new tactics and a breechloader of their own, the Chassepot. Beyond Prussia, other pro-Austrian German states and the subsequent future North German Confederation adopted the needle rifle.

=== Dominance and global spread (1866–1870s) ===
In the aftermath of the war against Austria, the southern German states of Baden and Würtemberg refused to join the North German Confederation, but they decided to adopt the Dreyse as their service rifle and Prussian military tactics in 1866, while Bavaria refused to adopt the Dreyse, continuing to use breechloader conversions of the Podewils gun, later adopting the Werder rifle in 1869. Production was ramped up after 1866 and when the Franco-Prussian War broke out in 1870, the Prussian Army had 1,150,000 needle guns in its inventory.

In 1867, Romania purchased 20,000 rifles and 11,000 carbines from the Prussian government. These were used to great effect in the Romanian War of Independence.

The Brazilian Imperial Army had purchased approximately 3,000 of these weapons for Caçadores (light infantry), but their poor performance due to the hot, humid climate found the weapon prone to jamming in the field, which resulted in their rapid withdrawal from frontline service.

During the late Bakumatsu period, arms dealer C. Lehmann smuggled the Dreyse, often known to the Japanese as the "Zunker" or "Tsunnar" (needle gun), which was manufactured along with its specific ammunition under the direction of Carl Köppen. In the aftermath of the Boshin War, several Japanese clans began importing firearms to modernize their armies in late 1869, with the Kii Domain acquiring 4,800 Dreyse rifles; Following the establishment of the Imperial Japanese Army in 1871, the Imperial government confiscated rifles from the disbanded feudal domains and imported more Dreyses to arm their newly raised units. The Imperial government issued troops with the Dreyse needle gun alongside the standard Minié-type musket and other equipment to suppress samurai rebels in Satsuma. China also acquired Dreyse rifles to modernize their armed forces, issuing them to some units in the 1870s—these rifles were also used in border clashes against Russian forces in the Manchurian border.

Nikolaus's son, Franz, tried to modernize the Dreyse needle gun by designing a system that allowed for automatic cocking when the bolt was opened. This was patented in 1874 with the rifles entering production in 1875. The only government adoption of the 1874 rifle was with the Baden border guards, though commercial rifles were produced until around 1900.

== Ammunition and mechanism ==
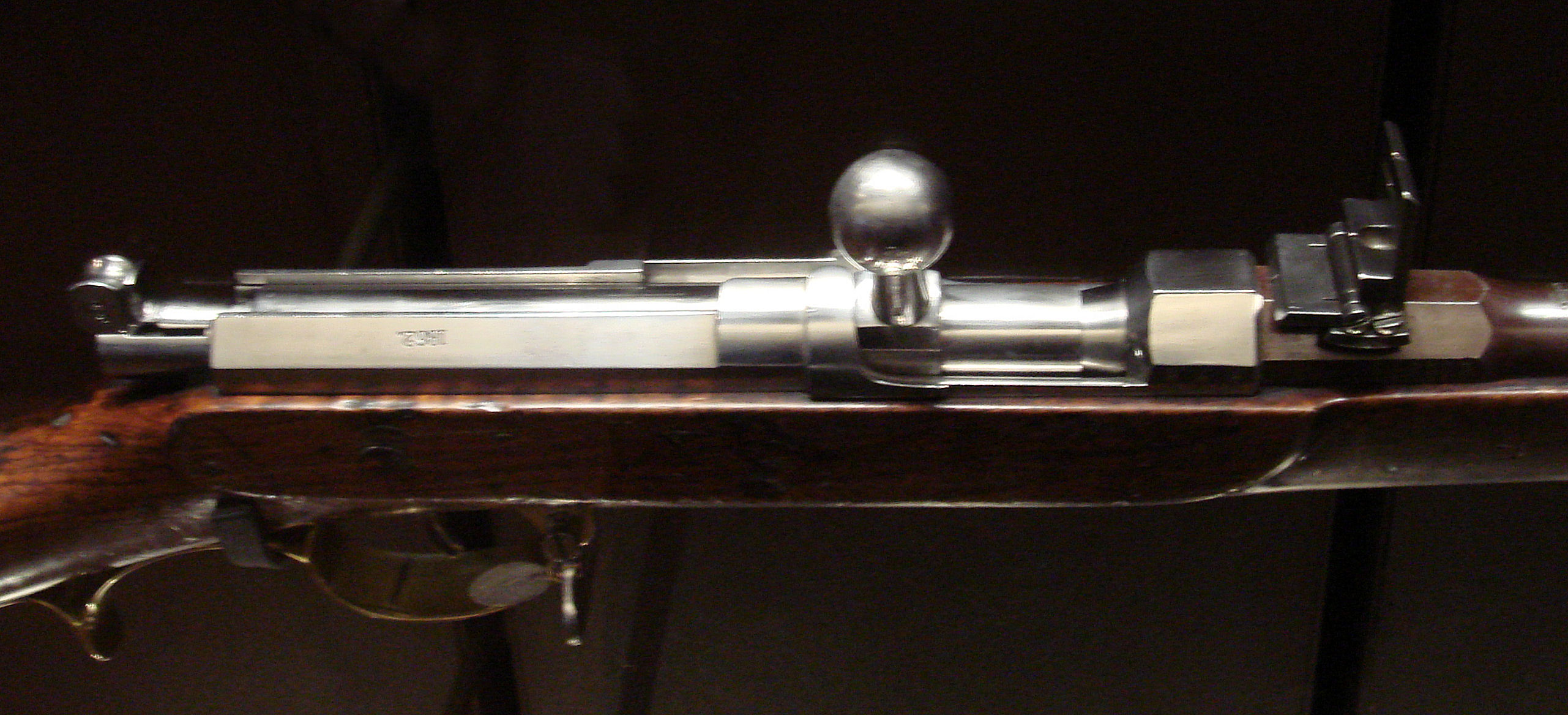
Dreyse mechanism, model 1862.

The cartridge used with this rifle consisted of the paper case, the bullet, the percussion cap and the black powder charge. The 15.4 mm (0.61 in) bullet was shaped like an acorn, with the broader end forming a point and the primer attached to its base. The bullet was held in a paper case known as a sabot, which separated from the bullet as it exited the muzzle. Between this inner lining and the outer case was the powder charge, consisting of 4.8 g (74 grains) of black powder.

The upper end of the paper case is rolled up and tied. Upon release of the trigger, the point of the needle pierces the rear of the cartridge, passes through the powder and hits the primer fixed to the base of the sabot. Thus the burn-front in the black powder charge passes from the front to the rear. This front-to-rear burn pattern minimizes the effect seen in rear-igniting cartridges where a portion of the powder at the front of the charge is wasted, as it is forced down and out of the barrel and burns in the air as muzzle flash. It also ensures that the whole charge burns under the highest possible pressure, theoretically minimising unburnt residues. Consequently, a smaller charge can be used to obtain the same velocity as a rear-ignited charge of the same bullet calibre and weight. It also increases the handling security of the cartridge, since it is virtually impossible to set the primer off accidentally.

There was also a blank cartridge developed for the needle gun. It was shorter and lighter than the live round, since it lacked the projectile, but was otherwise similar in construction and powder load.

== Limitations ==
British trials in 1849–1851 showed that:

- The spring that drove the needle was delicate.
- When the needle was dirty, the rifle tended to misfire. Colonel Hawker considered that a new needle was required every 12 shots.
- When the gun was heated and foul, operating the bolt required much strength.
- The barrel tended to wear at the junction with the cylinder.
- The escape of gas at the breech got worse as firing continued.

Its effective range was less than that of the Chassepot, against which it was fielded during the Franco-Prussian War. This was mainly because a sizable amount of gas escaped at the breech when the rifle was fired with a paper cartridge. An improved model, giving greater muzzle velocity and increased speed in loading, was introduced later, but it was replaced shortly thereafter by the Mauser Model 1871 rifle.

The placement of the primer directly behind the bullet meant the firing needle was enclosed in black powder when the gun was fired, causing stress to the pin, which could break over time and render the rifle useless until it could be replaced. Soldiers were provided with two replacement needles for that purpose. The needle could be easily replaced in under 30 seconds, even in the field. Because the rifle used black powder, residue accumulated at the back of the barrel, making cleaning necessary after about 60–80 shots. This was not a large problem because the individual soldier carried fewer cartridges than that and Dreyse created an "air chamber" by having a protruding needle tube. The Chassepot also had this, but it was more likely to jam after fewer shots because its chamber had a smaller diameter. A soldier trained before the Austro-Prussian War of 1866 had to finish field cleaning in less than 10 minutes.

== Comparison with contemporary rifles ==
Rifle	Dreyse	Kammerlader M1849/55	Pattern 1851 Minié rifle	Fusil modèle 1866 Chassepot rifle
Effective range	600 m (660 yd)	1,000 m (1,100 yd)	1,460 m (1,600 yd)	1,200 m (1,300 yd)
Sighted to	600 m (660 yd)			1,600 m (1,750 yd)
Rate of fire	6 rounds/minute	6 to 8 rounds/minute (estimate, see article)	2 rounds/minute	5 rounds/minute 6 to 7 rounds/minute
Calibre	15.4 mm (0.61 in)	17.5 mm (0.69 in)	17.8 mm (.702 in)	11 mm (0.43 in)
Muzzle velocity	305 m/s (1,000 ft/s)	265–350 m/s (870–1,150 ft/s)		
Barrel length	91 cm (35.8 in)	78 cm (30.7 in)	99.1 cm (39 in)	
Total length	142 cm (55.9 in)	126 cm (49.6 in)		
Loaded weight	4.7 kg (10.4 lb)	5 kg (11.0 lb)		

== Users ==
- Grand Duchy of Baden
- Empire of Brazil
- Kingdom of Dahomey
- German Empire
- Empire of Japan
- Principality of Montenegro
- Kingdom of Prussia
- Qing Empire
- Principality of Romania
- Kingdom of Württemberg

== See also ==
- Podewils gun
- M1819 Hall rifle
- Carle rifle
- Calisher and Terry carbine
- Werndl–Holub rifle
- Caseless ammunition

== Bibliography ==
- Aublet, Edouard-Edmond (1894). La guerre au Dahomey, 1888–1893 [The war on Dahomey, 1888–1893] (in French). Paris, France: Berger-Levrault.
- Craig, Gordon A. (2003). The Battle of Königgrätz: Prussia's Victory Over Austria, 1866. University of Pennsylvania Press. pp. 9–10. ISBN 978-0-8122-1844-2.
- Dredger, John A. (2017). Tactics and Procurement in the Habsburg Military, 1866–1918: Offensive Spending. Springer. ISBN 978-3-319-57678-7 – via Google Books.
- Esposito, Gabriele (2015). Armies of the War of the Triple Alliance: 1864–70 Paraguay, Brazil, Uruguay & Argentina (ePDF ed.). Oxford, UK: Osprey Publishing. ISBN 978-1-4728-0726-7.
- Esposito, Gabriele (2020). Japanese Armies 1868–1877: The Boshin War and Satsuma Rebellion (ePDF ed.). Oxford, UK: Osprey Publishing. ISBN 978-1-4728-3706-6.
- Förster, Stig; Nagler, Jörg (1997). On the Road to Total War: The American Civil War and the German Wars of Unification, 1861–1871. Cambridge: German Historical Institute. ISBN 0-521-56071-3.
- Jowett, Philip (2016). Imperial Chinese Armies 1840–1911 (ePDF ed.). Oxford, UK: Osprey Publishing. ISBN 978-1-4728-1428-9.
- Mossman, Samuel (1880). "Military Organization". Japan. London, UK: Sampson Low, Marston, Searle, & Rivington.
- Reade, Philip (1891). "Rifles, Military". Appleton's Annual Cyclopædia and Register of Important Events of the Year 1889. Vol. 14. New York City: D. Appleton and Company. p. 740 – via Google Books.
- Wawro, Geoffrey (1996). The Austro-Prussian War: Austria's War with Prussia and Italy in 1866. Cambridge, England: Cambridge University Press. ISBN 978-0-521-62951-5.
- Wawro, Geoffrey (2003). The Franco-Prussian War: The German Conquest of France in 1870–1871. Cambridge, England: Cambridge University Press. ISBN 978-1-139-45736-1.
