= Paper cartridge =

Various types of small arms ammunition

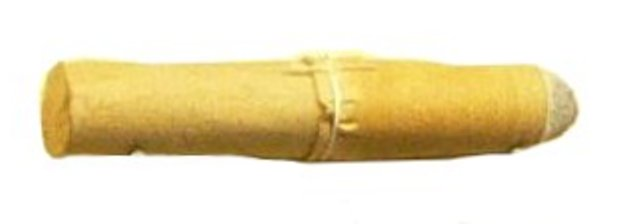
An 1866 Chassepot paper cartridge

A paper cartridge is one of various types of small arms ammunition used before the advent of the metallic cartridge. These cartridges consisted of a paper cylinder or cone containing the bullet, gunpowder, and in some cases, a primer or a lubricating and anti-fouling agent. Combustible cartridges are paper cartridges that use paper treated with oxidizers to allow them to burn completely upon ignition.

== History ==
Paper cartridges have been in use for nearly as long as hand-held firearms, with a number of sources dating their use back to the late 14th century. Historians note their use by soldiers of Christian I in 1586, while the Dresden museum has evidence dating their use to 1591, and Capo Bianco writes in 1597 that paper cartridges had long been in use by Neapolitan soldiers. Their use became widespread by the 17th century. The first army to officially use paper cartridges is presumed to be "piechota wybraniecka" of Poland under the rule of Stephen Báthory.

Paper cartridges were often coated in beeswax, lard, or tallow to aid with firearm functioning and maintenance. The coating repels water and protects the wrapped content from moisture, acts as lubricant for the bullet traveling down the bore, and melts upon firing; the melted coating mixes with the powder residue and makes resulting fouling easier to remove. The coating also protects gunpowder from being ignited by unintended sources like stray sparks, making them less hazardous to carry and handle (especially in combat).

=== Cultural impact ===
The standard procedure for loading a musket or rifled musket involved biting open the cartridge. In 1857, a new cartridge greased with tallow helped start the Indian Rebellion of 1857. The grease used on these cartridges was rumoured to include tallow derived from beef, which would be offensive to Hindus, and pork, which would be offensive to Muslims - and the sepoy soldiers in the employ of the British were largely Hindu or Muslim. Rumors of the use of lard and tallow in the lubrication of the cartridges they were using were part of the cause of the Rebellion of 1857.

== Construction and use ==
The most common applications of paper cartridges were in muzzleloading firearms. While these may be loaded with loose powder and balls or bullets, a paper cartridge combines a pre-measured amount of powder with the ball in a sealed unit. This eliminated the operation of measuring the powder during loading. In the case where multiple projectiles were used, such as buck and ball loads, the cartridge also served to package up the projectiles, so they did not have to be measured or counted out. The paper also served as a patch in smoothbore firearms, which fired balls that were smaller than the diameter of the bore, and wrapped a paper or cloth patch to make them fit snugly.

The paper used in cartridges varied considerably. The instructions for making Enfield paper cartridges, published in 1859, which uses three pieces of paper of two different thicknesses, shows the complexity that could be involved. Some cartridges, such as those for percussion revolvers, used nitrated paper. Treated by soaking in a potassium nitrate solution and then drying, this made the paper far more flammable and ensured it burned completely upon firing.

Despite the complexity involved in their construction, paper cartridges were used through the 19th century, from the Napoleonic Wars through the time of the American Civil War, after which time they were displaced by modern metallic cartridges.

Paper cartridges varied in their construction based on the specifications of the buyer or the practices of the builder; a cartridge tended to be built with a specific weapon in mind, with a specified powder charge and a correctly sized ball or bullet. A cartridge built for a .65 caliber musket obviously could not be used in a .50 caliber weapon. However, similarly-sized weapons could often share cartridges. During the American Civil War, the primary small arms used by each side were the .58 caliber Springfield Model 1861 rifle-musket (North), and the .577 caliber Enfield rifle-musket (South). The two guns were similar enough that both sides could make use of ammunition captured from the enemy without any problems. The loose-fitting nature of minie ball ammunition in rifled muskets meant that slightly undersized ammunition could be used in a pinch, although accuracy would be degraded compared to correctly sized ammunition.

There are a number of features which are not specific to any particular firearm, and so apply to any paper cartridge. For example, the cartridge must be sturdy enough to withstand the handling it can be expected to receive. This means either a sturdy paper must be used, or the cartridge must be reinforced for strength. The importance of paper cartridges can be seen by the existence of cartridge paper, a paper specially produced for the production of paper cartridges. In some cases the cartridges were produced directly from paper pulp, and formed into a seamless cylinder of the correct diameter.

=== For smoothbore muskets ===
Smoothbore muskets were loaded with lead balls, slightly smaller than the diameter of the bore, to make them easier to ram down the barrel (especially as fouling built up); a "patch" of paper or cloth was wrapped around the bullet before inserting it into the barrel, to make it fit snugly, so it wouldn't roll back out when the muzzle was tipped downward. It also helped the ball to not bounce around inside of the barrel as it was fired (see windage). A typical flintlock cartridge consisted of a paper tube, tied off in three places to form two compartments. The first compartment contained the projectile or projectiles, either a single round ball or a large round ball plus three buckshot in the case of a buck and ball load. The second compartment contained the charge of powder. To load the musket, the following steps were used:

- Hold the musket level, place at half cock, and open the flash pan
- Bite open a cartridge, pour a small quantity of powder into the pan, and close it
- Hold the musket vertically, and pour the remaining powder down the barrel
- Ram the ball and remaining paper down the barrel with the ramrod

The paper, typically a thick, sturdy variety, keeps the undersized bullet centered in the bore. As each shot leaves progressively more fouling in the barrel from the black powder, this makes each shot harder and harder to load. This can be helped by using a lubricant, which serves not only to help the ball slide down the barrel, but also serves to soften the fouling in the bore, so that it is pushed clear during loading.

=== For percussion rifles ===
Diagram of an 1853 Enfield rifled musket cartridge, showing the three layers of paper and how they combine to form the cartridge

With the advent of the rifle-musket and the widespread adoption of rifled barrels by military forces, the spherical projectile eventually died out – though the new elongated bullets were still called balls in the military. Full metal jacket bullets are called ball ammunition to this day. While both conical bullets and balls were used with rifles, both in cartridge and loose form for several hundred years, the mid 19th century Minié ball contained a number of important innovations that allowed rifled weapons to be adopted by the main infantry units, rather than being the preserve of elite skirmisher and rifle units as had been the case before.

Minie balls were manufactured in a smaller diameter than the bore of the weapon it was to be used in, just like a normal musket ball; this allowed for easy loading, even when the gun was fouled, while a rifle ball had to be forced down the tight-fitting barrel by force, even using a mallet. When fired, the pressure of the gases would force the skirt of the bullet to expand, fitting tightly into the rifling grooves, unlike the loose-fitting and inaccurate musket ball. This was achieved by including a deep cavity in the rear, into which fitted (initially) an iron hemispherical cup, later a conical clay or timber plug, which caused the base of the projectile to expand upon firing, sealing the skirt to the bore, allowing an undersized projectile to be used for ease of loading without a patch. (Eventually it was found that the pressure of the powder gases expanded the base to fit the bore, without any plug or filler.) Another was a number of grooves around the projectile, the leading edges of which are intended to scrape out the fouling but were found better used making the projectile more accurate when filled with a lubricant (traditionally made of beeswax and rendered animal fat.) As noted before, this lubricant also serves to keep the black powder fouling soft, thus making the fouled barrel much easier to reload.

As the speed of the projectile increased with better and more consistent black powders, loading and firing techniques, it was found that a lead projectile, in close fit, would leave lead streaking behind adding to the fouling of the bore. Lubrication aided somewhat, but that too had its problems picking up grit and other hard detritus which damaged the bore of the firearm. The solution was to encase the bearing surface of the projectile in paper, with a lubricated wad or waxed cotton disc placed behind the projectile. With a grooved projectile, lubrication is available directly, often negating the need for further lubricated wads behind the projectile.

With a rifled barrel, the projectile needs to engage the rifling for it to impart the spin which improves accuracy dramatically. The Minié ball allowed easy loading of a slightly undersized skirted projectile that would expand to seal; or a loose-fitting round ball would use the paper of the cartridge as wad and sealant. Accuracy went from 50 to 100 yards for the smoothbore out to some 400 to 600 yards with repeatable accuracy for rifled barrels. At the longest of ranges a rifled barrel could accomplish 2000 to 2500 yards. While lacking pinpoint accuracy, effective harassing fire at an enemy some distance away became possible with units of disciplined riflemen firing in alternating volleys aimed at a common target.

A solid lead projectile used in a rifled barrel requires the paper around the bullet to be much thinner than in a smoothbore, to fill in the space between bullet and bore achieving a gas-tight fit. To meet this requirement, while still ensuring a rugged cartridge, the cartridges were made in multiple parts. The following describes the construction of a cartridge for a British Enfield musket, from the inside out:

- A short tube of stiff paper, which provides the strength for the cartridge
- A longer tube of thin paper, pushed inwards at one end, which serves to separate the powder from the bullet
- A long tube of thin paper, which holds the bullet at one end, and the stiffened powder container at the other

The bullet end of the cartridge was crimped shut, and the powder end was filled and folded closed. The bullet end of the completed cartridge was then dipped in a mixture of melted beeswax and tallow to lubricate the bullet.

To load the rifle, the powder end was opened up by unfolding or tearing, and the powder was poured down the barrel. The bullet end was then inserted up to the level of the thick paper tube, which was then torn off and discarded. The bullet was then seated with the ramrod, and the nipple primed with a percussion cap.

=== Nitrated cartridges for percussion revolvers ===
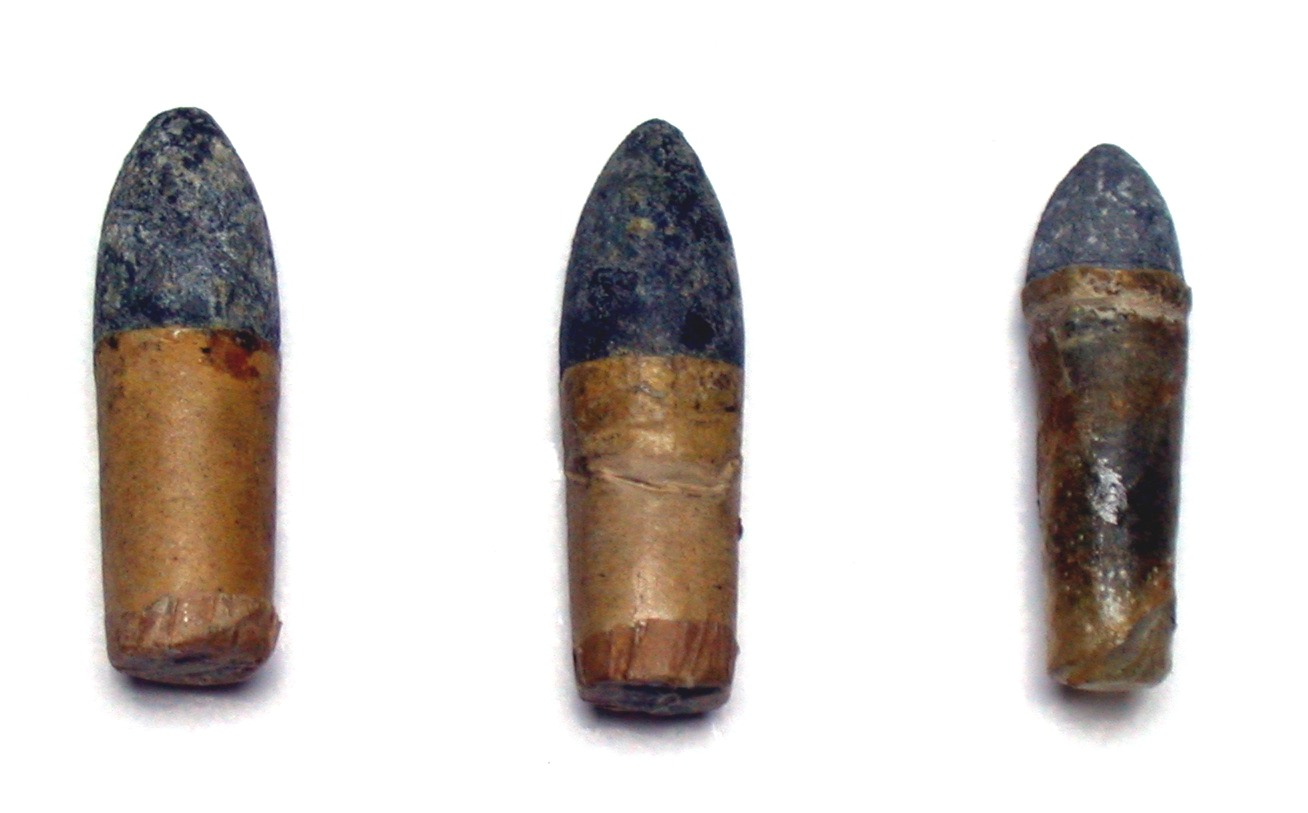
.44 and .36 paper cartridges for Colt percussion revolvers

Typical paper cartridges for revolvers differ from the robust percussion rifle cartridges, in that the cartridge is inserted into the chamber whole, and rammed into place. Revolver cartridges were often combustible, and the bullet was typically exposed. The paper cartridge was glued, typically with sodium silicate, a high temperature glue that was widely available, as it was also used to preserve fresh eggs. Many examples were tapered into a cone, being wider at the bullet than at the rear. Some commercially produced cartridges, such as those by Hayes of England, were also equipped with a small cloth tear tab at the front to assist in the removal of the protective outer layer prior to loading the cartridge.

The revolver paper cartridge lasted longer than it otherwise would have and encompassed a wider range of forms, due to Rollin White's patent covering bored through cylinders on a revolver (adopted for a paper cartridge application). That patent was exclusively licensed to Smith & Wesson, giving them an effective monopoly on the American manufacture of effective cartridge revolvers until the patent expired. Prevented from converting to rimfire or centerfire cartridges, other manufacturers had to remain with percussion systems or develop proprietary front-loading cartridges.

=== For breechloaders ===
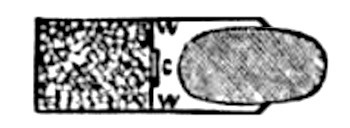
An 1872 diagram of a Prussian needle gun cartridge

The concept of a fully self-contained paper cartridge for a breech loader was patented in 1808, only a year after the invention of the percussion cap. One of the earliest breechloading firearms that was widely adopted was the Dreyse needle gun, patented in 1839, which was used by the Prussian army. The needle gun used a unitary cartridge, containing bullet, powder, and primer in a paper wrapper. The primer was located at the base of the bullet, and the firing pin, or needle, penetrated the back of the case, went through the powder, and struck the primer to ignite it.

The acorn-shaped bullet used by the Prussians was carried in a Papier-mâché sabot which served not only to seal the bore, but also contain the primer.

The fragility of the breechloading needle gun was a primary reason that only a few militaries adopted the system; in the well trained Prussian army, this was handled by having each soldier carry several spare needles. This allowed the individual soldiers to repair their guns in the field.

=== Paper shotshells ===
Paper shotshells, consisting of a paper body with a brass base and rim, have continued to be made and used many years after their general replacement with plastic shotshells. The only areas where these are still used in fairly large numbers, though, are in extremely cold areas where plastic shells often split when fired at −40-degree C temperatures (−40F), and when handloading very low pressure rounds for extremely old shotguns. Paper shotshells consist of a coiled paper tube placed in a brass base, with the web of the case made of compressed paper pulp. These cartridges are sturdy enough to be reloaded many times.
