= Pellet (air gun) =

Non-spherical projectile designed to be shot from an air gun

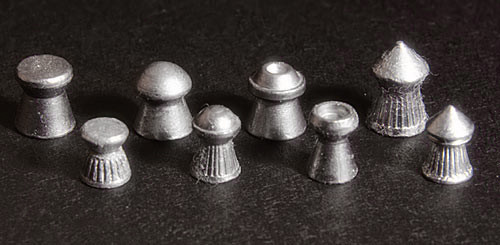
A range of "diabolo" pellets with various nose profiles

A pellet is a non-spherical projectile designed to be fired from an air gun, and an airgun that fires such pellets is commonly known as a pellet gun. Air gun pellets differ from bullets, shells and shot used in firearms and artillery in terms of the pressures encountered; airguns operate at pressures as low as 50 atmospheres, while firearms and artillery operate at thousands of atmospheres. Airguns generally use a slightly undersized projectile that is designed to obturate upon shooting so as to seal the bore, and engage the rifling; firearms have sufficient pressure to force a slightly oversized bullet to fit the bore in order to form a tight seal. Since pellets may be shot through a smoothbore barrel, they are often designed to be inherently stable, much like the Foster slugs used in smoothbore shotguns.

== Types ==
=== Diabolo pellet ===
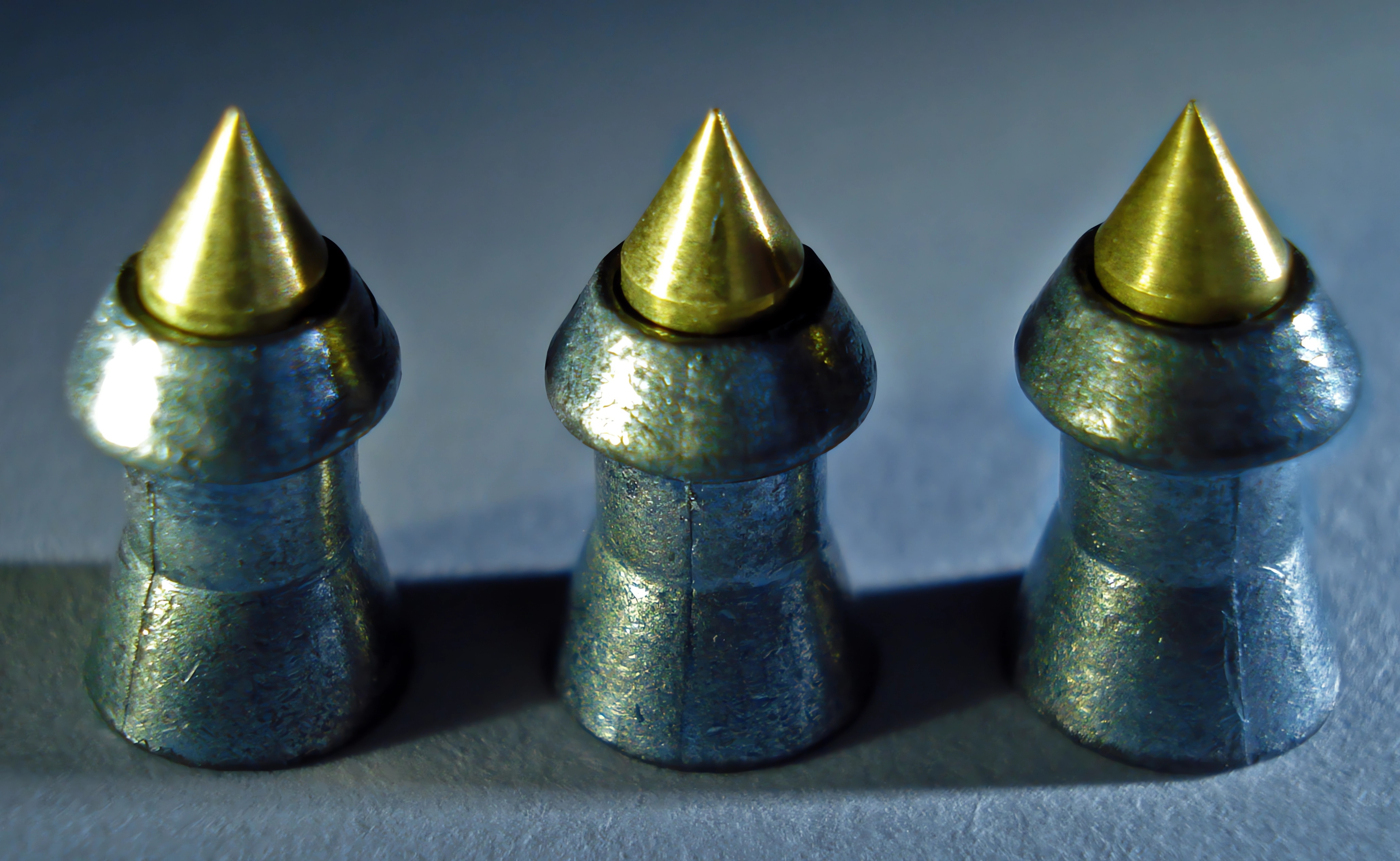
Hornet Cal. 4,5mm (.177). Special pellet for hunting purposes. Lead with a point of brass. Extremely high penetrating power

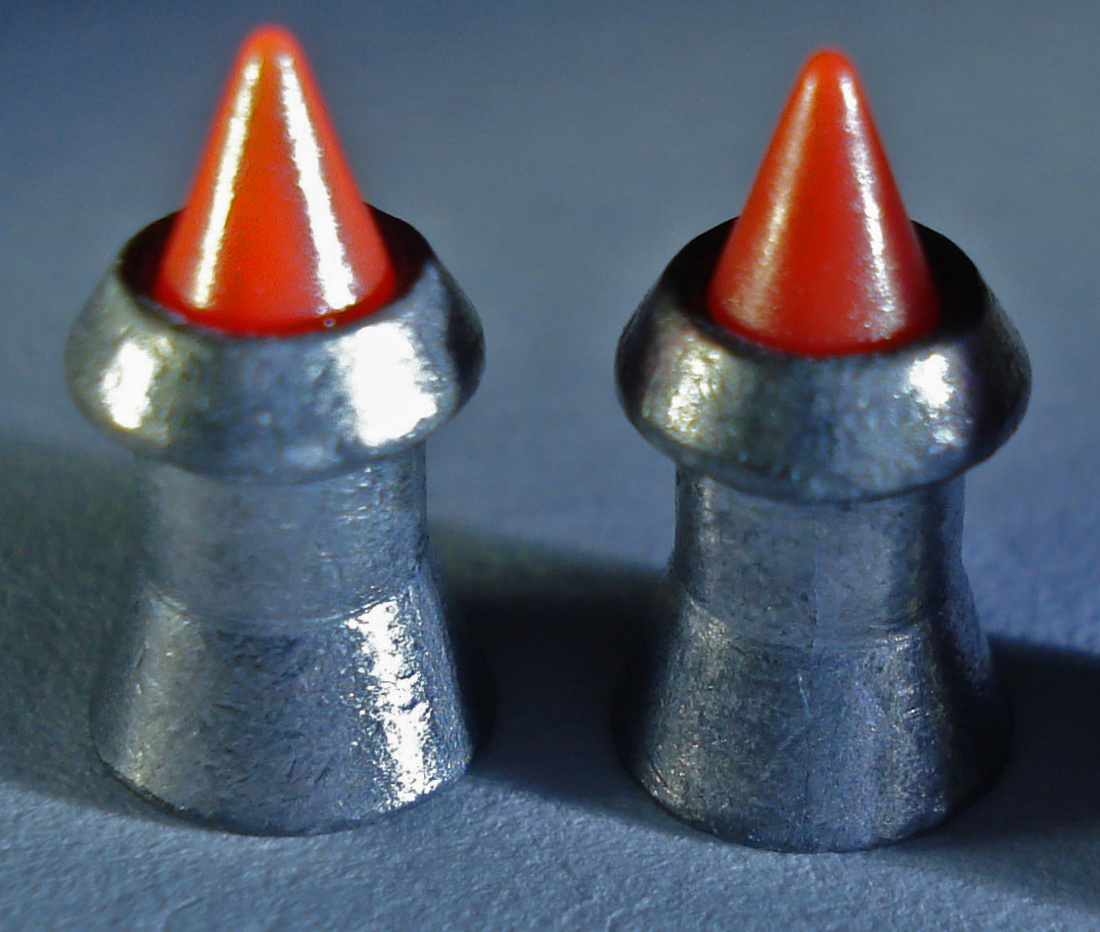
Hunter Impact Cal. 4,5mm (.177). Pellet for hunting purposes. Lead with a point of synthetic polymers

The diabolo pellet (or "wasp waist pellet") is the most common design traditionally found in airguns. It consists of a solid front portion called the head, which can have a flat ("wadcutter"), hemispherical ("round nose"), hollow point or conical ("pointed") front end profile, and a thin-walled funnel-shaped hollow rear portion called the skirt, joined by an hourglass-looking narrow mid-section known as the waist, giving the whole pellet the shape of a diabolo. The head is usually sized to just touch the rifling, and this keeps the pellet centered in the bore while keeping the friction as low as possible. The effect of friction is used in order to keep the pellet stationary until the piston has reached the end of its travel, compressing as much air as is possible. The thin hollow skirt is made of a malleable material, usually lead, although non-toxic alternatives are available that use tin or even plastic. During shooting, the skirt flares out and obturates the bore when pressure builds up behind it to provide a good seal that allows efficient pellet acceleration, and engages the rifling whereby imparting spin. In a smoothbore barrel, the skirt will still flare to provide a tight seal, but since there is no rifling the pellet will not spin, and is less accurate.

Because the majority of the pellet's mass resides in the solid head in the front, and the hollow skirt in the back generates significant drag during flight, this creates drag stability that will counteract yawing and help to maintain consistent trajectories. However, such stability is limited, and if the pellet's speed exceeds what the aerodynamics allow it will become unstable and start tumbling in flight. When this happens, the pellet can hit the target sideways and leave behind a keyhole-shaped impact hole on the target paper, instead of a clean round hole as expected from a direct frontal hit. This phenomenon is known as keyholing.

Pellets are designed to travel at subsonic speeds. High velocities can cause light pellets to overly deform, or even break apart in flight. The transition from subsonic to supersonic velocities will cause almost all pellets to tumble. The closer a pellet gets to the speed of sound, the more unstable it becomes. This is a problem for high-powered "magnum" break-barrel and pre-charged pneumatic air rifles, which are capable of pushing lighter pellets beyond the sound barrier. A few companies have addressed this issue by manufacturing heavier-than-normal pellets for use in these high powered air guns. The heavier weight of these pellets ensures lower muzzle velocities, resulting in less chance of tumbling and more overall accuracy. Their weight also makes them sectionally denser and less susceptible to wind deviation and drag deceleration, and thus imparts better external and terminal ballistic performance.

=== Spherical pellets ===
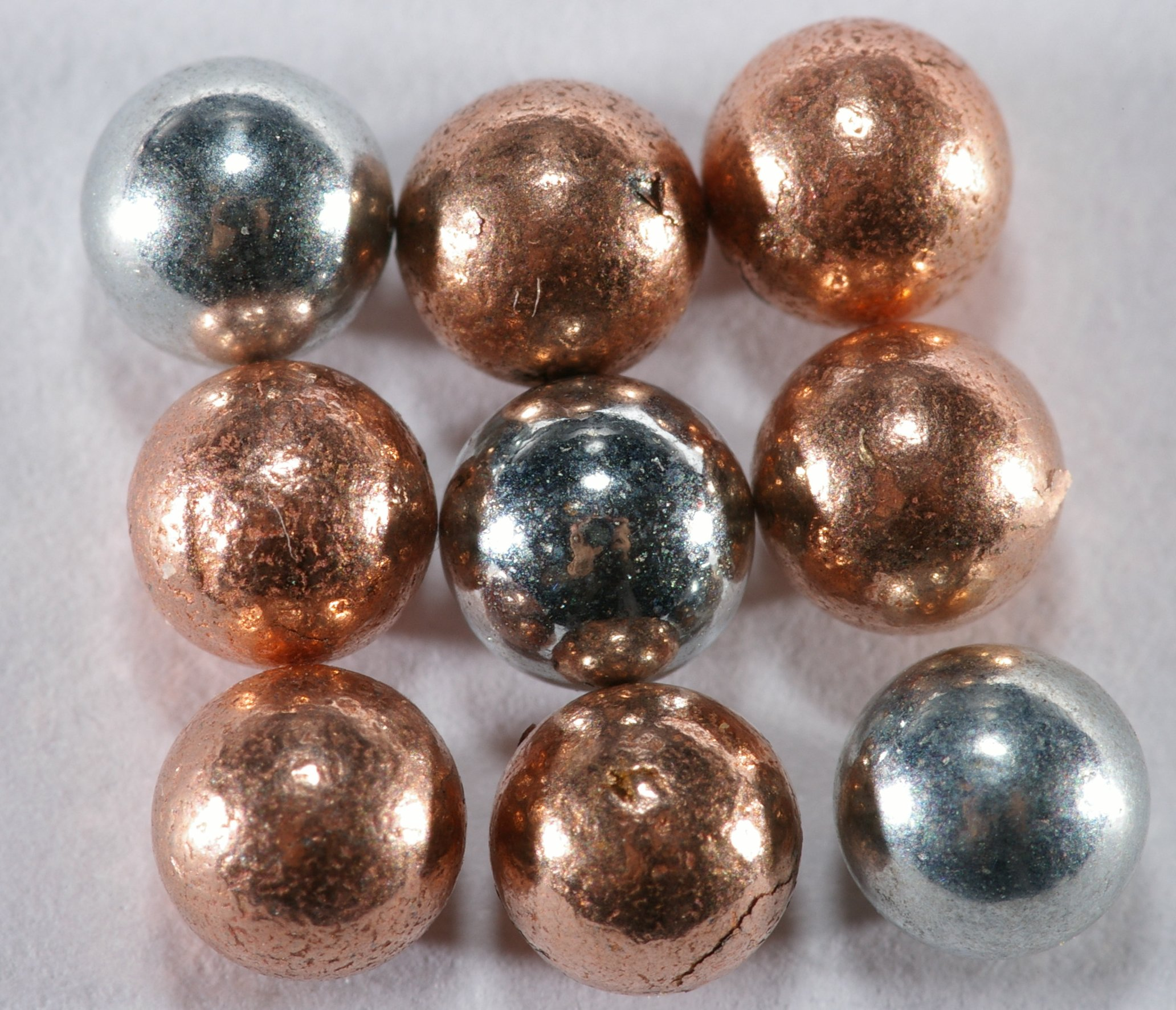
Steel ball shots with copper or zinc jackets

The earliest airgun pellets are actually small round lead shots similar to those used in muskets. First popularized by the Daisy BB Gun in the 1890s, a spring-piston airgun that shot "BB"-size birdshots, the .180-caliber lead shots were later replaced by the lighter .175-caliber steel shots modified from bearing balls, and remained popular as a plinking/pest shooting projectile due to the popularity and affordability of BB guns such as the Daisy Red Ryder.

Modern BB guns use the same calibers as the pellet guns, namely the .177 caliber and (occasionally) .22 caliber. Galvinized/copper-coated steel balls are the commonest projectile used in BB guns due to their better muzzle speed and penetration, but are only used in smoothbore barrels due to the risk of wearing down riflings, therefore lead balls are still used for rifled barrels.

=== Slug pellet ===
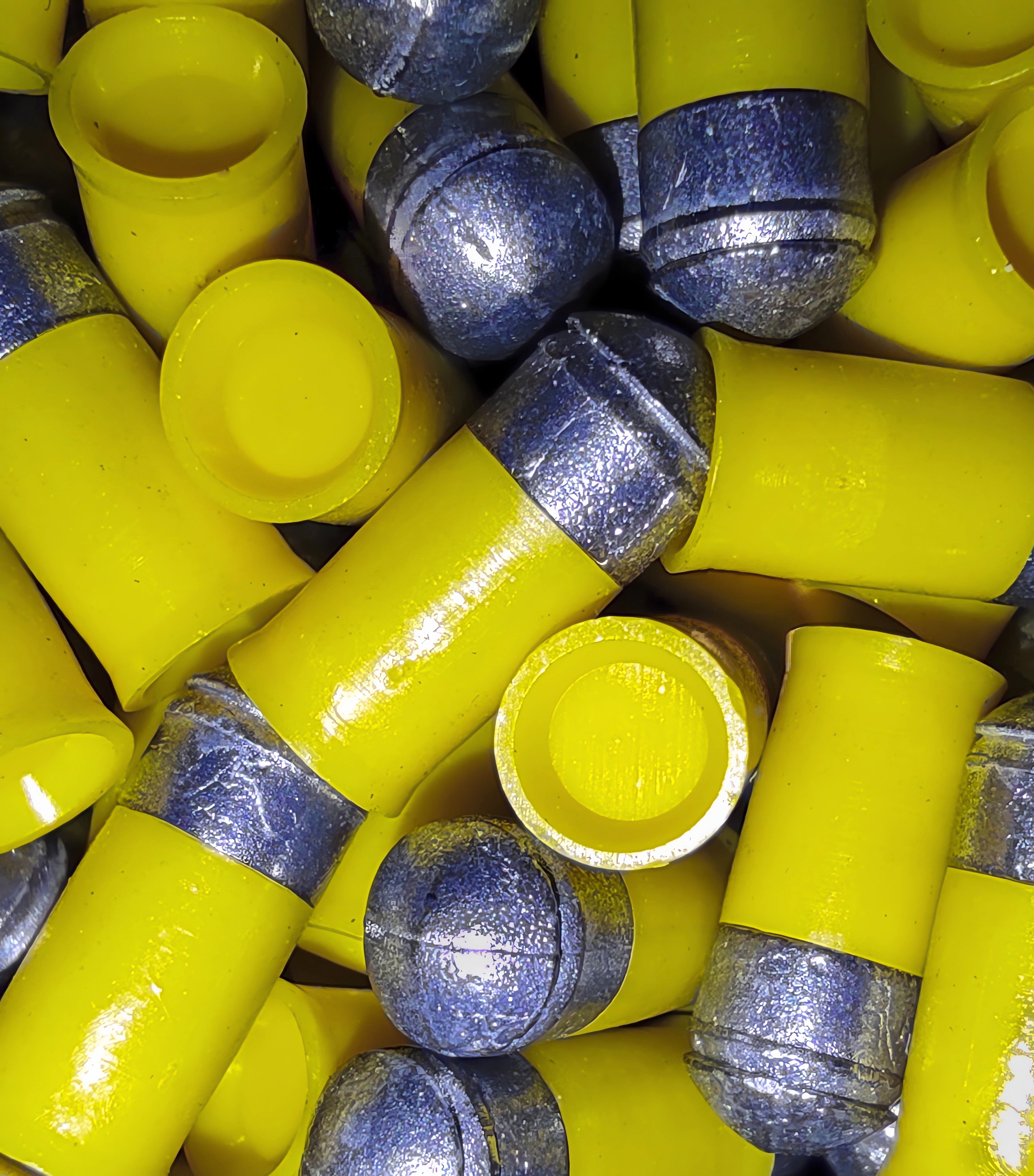
Eisenherz Cal. 4,5mm (.177). Plastic-coated pellet with a core of hard metal. For hunting purposes.

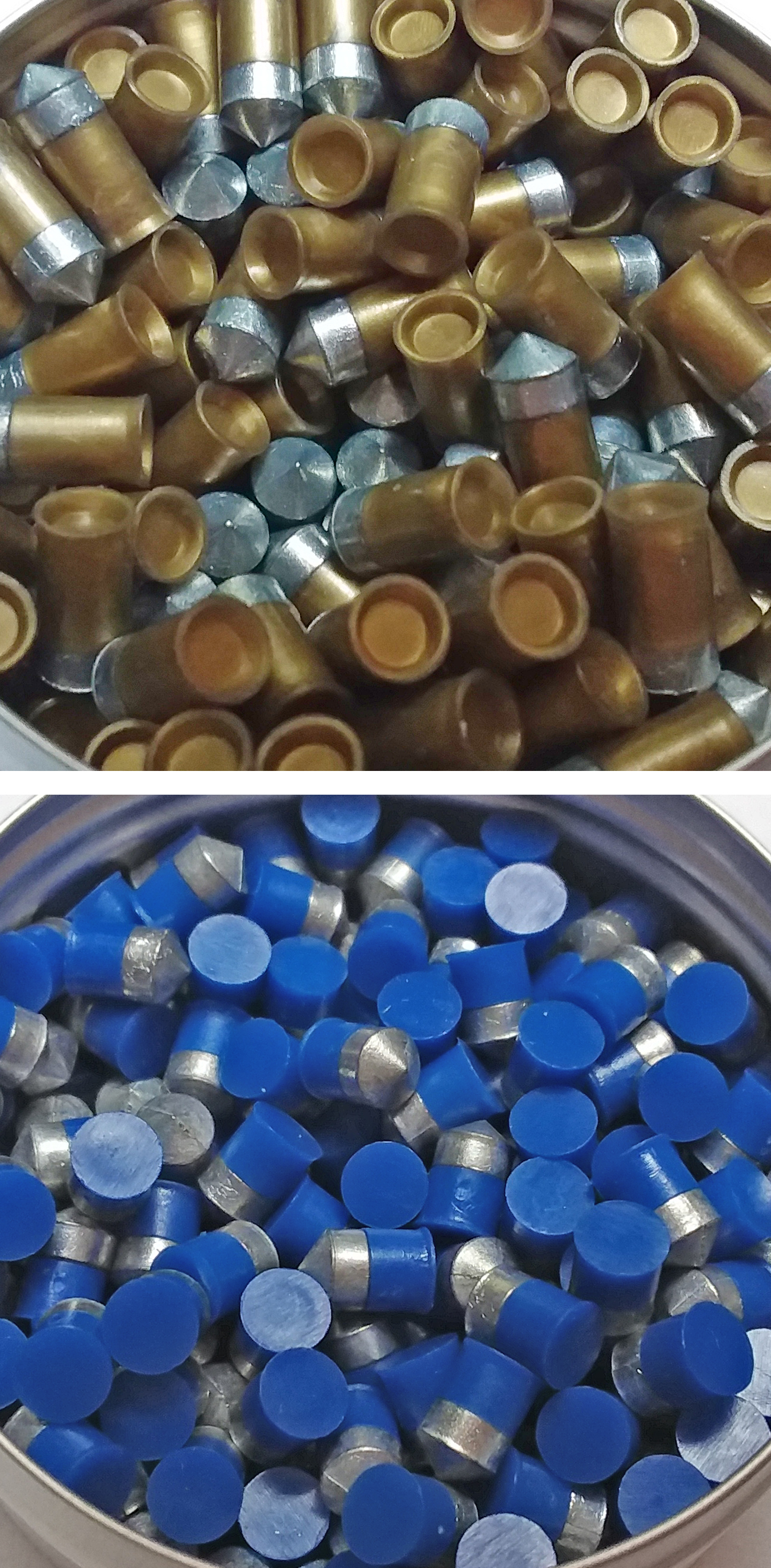
Plastic-coated pellets with a pointed steel core: Highest possible penetration power. Top: For rifles, bottom: for CO2-pistols with a revolver magazine

Recently, some manufacturers also have introduced the more cylindro-conoidally shaped "slug" pellets for some of the more powerful modern PCP air rifles. Contrasted to the commonly used diabolo pellets, these slug pellets are essentially Minié balls, with cannelures and a hollow base, and have more contact surface with the bore and hence need greater propelling force to overcome friction, but they have better ballistic coefficients and thus longer effective ranges due to the more aerodynamic shape. Because these slug pellets have no skirts to generate enough drag stability in flight, they rely on spin stabilization from a fully rifled barrel.

== Lead-free pellets ==
There are many different kinds of lead-free pellets, utilizing non-lead alloys and/or plastics in their construction. Consequently, they are much lighter than lead pellets, with weights ranging from 5.1 gr (0.33 g) to around 20 gr (1.3 g). Due to their lighter weight, they accelerate more quickly inside the barrel, and commonly reach supersonic velocities. This increases the effective feet per second (FPS) of an airgun, which can result in greater accuracy.

However, lead-free pellets typically have a lower ballistic coefficient (BC), which results in more wind-drift, and reduced velocity at longer distances. As an example, H&N Sport's Baracuda Green pellet has a BC of 0.013, but the standard Baracuda pellet's BC is 0.024.

Although some airguns are equipped with moderators or other noise dampening chambers, lead-free pellets can break the sound-barrier, and produce a loud cracking noise. This can be misinterpreted as a malfunction of the suppressor, when in fact it results from using a supersonic pellet. Upon switching back to a lead pellet, the supersonic crack will cease.

H&N Sport markets their lead-free pellets as part of their "GreenLine," and Gamo markets their lead-free pellets as a "Performance Ballistic Alloy" (PBA). Regardless of the terminology, the underlying technology involves a mix of non-lead materials, such as zinc, iron, tin, or copper. Lead-free pellets are offered by all major manufacturers, including RWS, Gamo, H&N Sport, Predator International, JSB, Crosman, SIG Sauer, and others.

These metals are all lighter than lead, and significantly harder. As a result, they penetrate more deeply, and do not deform as greatly upon impact with the target. By contrast, lead pellets are often designed to fragment, expand, or mushroom, and can cause more damage. As a result, they are favored by hunters. However, many hunters are using non-lead pellets, to avoid lead contamination.

== Match shooting use ==
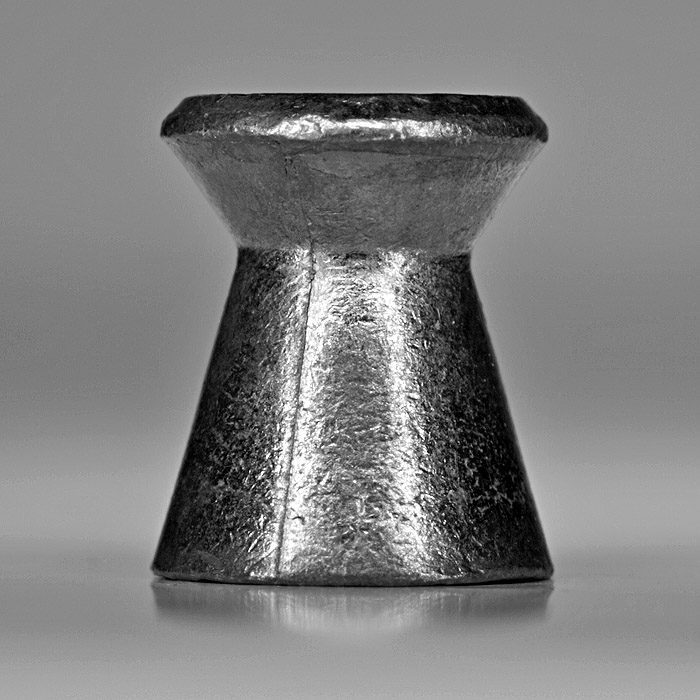
A H&N Final Match Pistol 4.5 mm (.177 in) match diabolo pellet

Match pellets are used for the 10 metre air rifle and 10 metre air pistol disciplines. These 4.5 mm (0.177 in) calibre pellets have wadcutter heads, meaning the front is (nearly) flat, that leave clean, hole punch-like round holes in paper targets for easy scoring. Match pellets are offered in tins and more elaborate packagings that avoid deformation and other damage that could impair their uniformity.

Most match pellets are made of soft lead (a lead alloy with low antimony content), but some companies offer lead-free versions. The antimony content is used to control the hardness of the soft lead alloy. It is a very soft alloy, which makes it easy to process. Since the soft lead alloy is prone to strongly deform when striking a bullet catcher, it rapidly loses its kinetic energy and will not easily bounce off. Lead is toxic and hazardous to the environment, so precautions should be taken if shooting with lead pellets. For this reason, many shooters use lead-free match pellets, produced by H&N Sport, Predator International, JSB, RWS, Olympia Shot, Gamo, or Daisy.

Match air gun shooters are encouraged to perform shooting group tests with their gun clamped in a fixed rest in order to establish which particular pellet type performs best for their air gun. To facilitate maximum performance out of various air guns the leading match pellet manufacturers produce pellets in graduated weight variants (the light/high speed variants are often marketed for air pistol use) and with graduated "head sizes", which means the pellets are offered with front diameters from 4.48 mm (0.176 in) up to 4.52 mm (0.178 in).

However at higher and top competitive levels, even these variations are thought too coarse-grained and match pellets are batch tested; that is, the specific gun is mounted in a machine rest test rig and pellets from a specific production run on a specific machine with the same ingredients fed into the process (a batch) are test-fired through the gun. Many different batches will be tested in this manner, and the pellets which give the smallest consistent group size without fliers (shots which fall outside of the main group) will be selected (small but inconsistent group sizes are not useful to a top competitor); and the shooter will then purchase several tens of thousands of pellets from that batch. Group sizes of 4.5 mm (0.177 in) diameter are theoretically possible, but practically shot groups of 5.0 mm (0.197 in) are considered highly competitive. Unbatched ammunition, especially if the air gun is not regularly cleaned, is generally thought to be capable of only 8.0 mm (0.315 in) diameter group sizes. Batch testing match pellets for a particular gun is not generally thought to be worthwhile until the shooter reaches a high proficiency level, around the 95% level (570 for men, 380 for women).

== Dieseling of pellets ==
"Dieseling" is a term used to describe the deliberate or accidental combustion of lubricant oil or similar flammable hydrocarbons when an air rifle is discharged, often with a loud muzzle report (which airguns are not expected to have) and a puff of visible thin smoke being ejected from the muzzle. Spring- or gas ram-powered air rifles work via a piston pump rapidly compressing the air in the chamber behind the projectile (usually a pellet), forcing the it out at speed. Adiabatic compression causes the temperature to rise rapidly, which may ignite flammable lubricants or contaminants within the airgun chamber and barrel, in a similar way to the compression ignition of fuel in a diesel engine. This combustion adds extra energy to the system, some of which is transferred to the projectile as increased velocity due to an afterburner-like effect as if liquid propellant is used.

Owing to the relatively small muzzle energy of air rifles compared to the stored chemical energy in oil, dieseling can make a substantial difference to the muzzle velocity of the pellet. While generally an unwanted phenomenon due to the effect on accuracy and also potential damage to rifle or sight, it is sometimes deliberately engineered by oiling the rear hollow base of the pellet or chamber, in order to increase the power of the weapon. This is usually done as a stunt or in experimentation — the tiny amounts of oil involved makes consistency impractical, with consequent substantial adverse effect on accuracy. To avoid dieseling, non-flammable silicone grease-based lubricants can be used instead of hydrocarbon ones.

== See also ==
- Air gun
- Airsoft pellet
- BB gun
- Tannerite pellet
