= Line infantry =

Type of light infantry arranged in lines, now obsolete

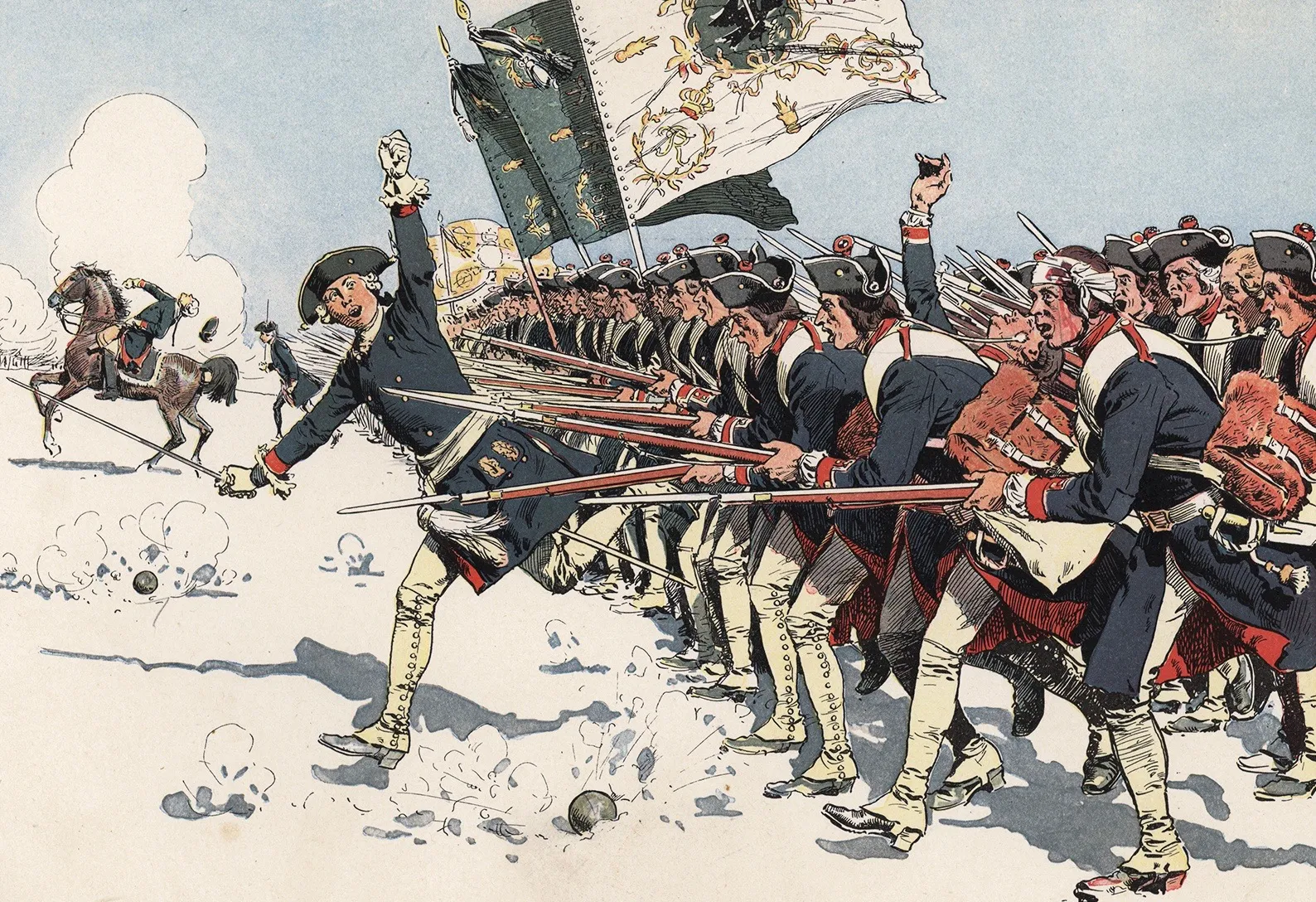
Prussian Army line infantry at the 1741 Battle of Mollwitz

Line infantry was a type of infantry that trained and organized to fight in linear formations, usually arranged two or three ranks deep, to deliver coordinated volleys of musket or rifle fire. This method of warfare began in the late sixteenth and early seventeenth centuries, with its origins commonly attributed to reforms by Maurice of Nassau and the Dutch army. Dutch practices were soon adopted by other European armies and became widespread through military manuals, the movement of officers, and the training of foreign troops by Dutch instructors. Further development occurred in the eighteenth century under leaders such as Frederick the Great of Prussia, who refined drill, discipline, and the use of concentrated musket fire. His methods made the Prussian infantry a model for other European powers. The tactics and organization of line infantry reached their most widespread application during the Napoleonic Wars, when massed ranks of soldiers firing in volleys formed the core of European armies on large battlefields.

Line infantry continued to play a central role in major conflicts into the nineteenth century. The American Civil War saw some of the last large-scale uses of linear tactics, although changes in weapon technology were already making such formations increasingly risky. The introduction of rifled muskets and then breech-loading rifles, along with advances in artillery, increased the range, accuracy, and lethality of battlefield fire. These changes made dense lines of infantry more vulnerable and reduced the effectiveness of traditional line tactics. By the late nineteenth century, most armies had shifted to looser formations and new approaches to infantry combat, leading to the decline of line infantry as the standard method of organization and fighting.

== Development ==
In the 16th and 17th century most battles where fought in squares or tercios composed of pikemen with smaller squares of musketeers at all four corners. The formation first appeared in Spain in 1534, and was initially composed of 12 companies of 250 men, each company being subdivided into ten squads (esquadras) of 25 men.

Advances in weaponry during this period led to major changes in military tactics. Spanish commanders tested various methods to improve the effectiveness of firearms, but Maurice of Nassau introduced the most successful approach in the 1590s. He drew inspiration from Roman military writers and began incorporating exercises such as forming and reforming ranks, drilling, and parading. William Louis of Nassau, Maurice’s cousin, realized after reading Aelian’s Tactics that rotating ranks of musketeers could maintain a steady rate of fire. This system allowed soldiers to fire in groups, then move to the back to reload while another group fired, creating a continuous stream of musket fire and addressing the slow firing rate of muzzle-loading muskets.

This development changed how armies deployed on the battlefield. Forces now spread out more, both to increase the effectiveness of their own gunfire and to lessen their vulnerability to enemy fire. The linear arrangement of troops meant more soldiers could fire at the enemy at once, which increased the lethality of engagements. However, this also meant that more soldiers faced direct combat, requiring greater discipline, skill, and courage from each individual. Success depended on soldiers and entire units executing complex maneuvers quickly and in coordination. To achieve this, the Nassau family reduced the size of military units for better training and control.

Companies became smaller, and large regiments were replaced by more manageable battalions. Count John of Nassau contributed to these reforms by creating drill books and founding a military academy at Siegen in 1616 to educate young officers. The curriculum included practical instruction with weapons, maps, and models, and the academy’s first director published manuals based on Dutch methods. These Dutch training techniques and tactical systems quickly spread throughout Europe, especially in Protestant regions, as many foreigners served in the Dutch army or learned from published treatises.

=== Early use ===
Gustav II Adolf of Sweden was among the earliest commanders to make extensive use of the new tactics. He had learned from Jacob De la Gardie, a former student at the military academy in Siegen, who brought Dutch influences to Sweden. Gustavus maintained the basic structure of Maurice of Nassau’s linear formations but made his arrangements more flexible and mobile, placing stronger emphasis on the integration of different troop types within his army. One of Gustavus’s main innovations was to increase the number of musketeers in his formations and to reduce the depth of the combat line to six ranks, compared to the customary ten.

He also replaced older arquebuses with improved matchlock muskets, initially fired from forked rests and later by lighter models that could be used from the shoulder. For greater efficiency, Gustavus introduced paper cartridges that contained both gunpowder and a ball, allowing soldiers to load and fire more quickly. With these, each musketeer carried a bandoleer or belt holding up to fifteen ready-to-use cartridges, which simplified the loading process on the battlefield.

Gustavus organized his troops into squadrons made up of both pikemen and musketeers. The standard Swedish squadron contained 216 pikemen and 192 musketeers, resulting in a somewhat higher proportion of pikes compared to the Dutch battalion. Gustavus believed pikemen remained essential for protecting musketeers from cavalry attacks, and he maintained that the pike was crucial for driving opponents from the field. Several squadrons were usually combined into a brigade for larger operations. In battle, squadrons could be reinforced with additional musketeers or could distribute some troops for roles such as reconnaissance or supporting cavalry.

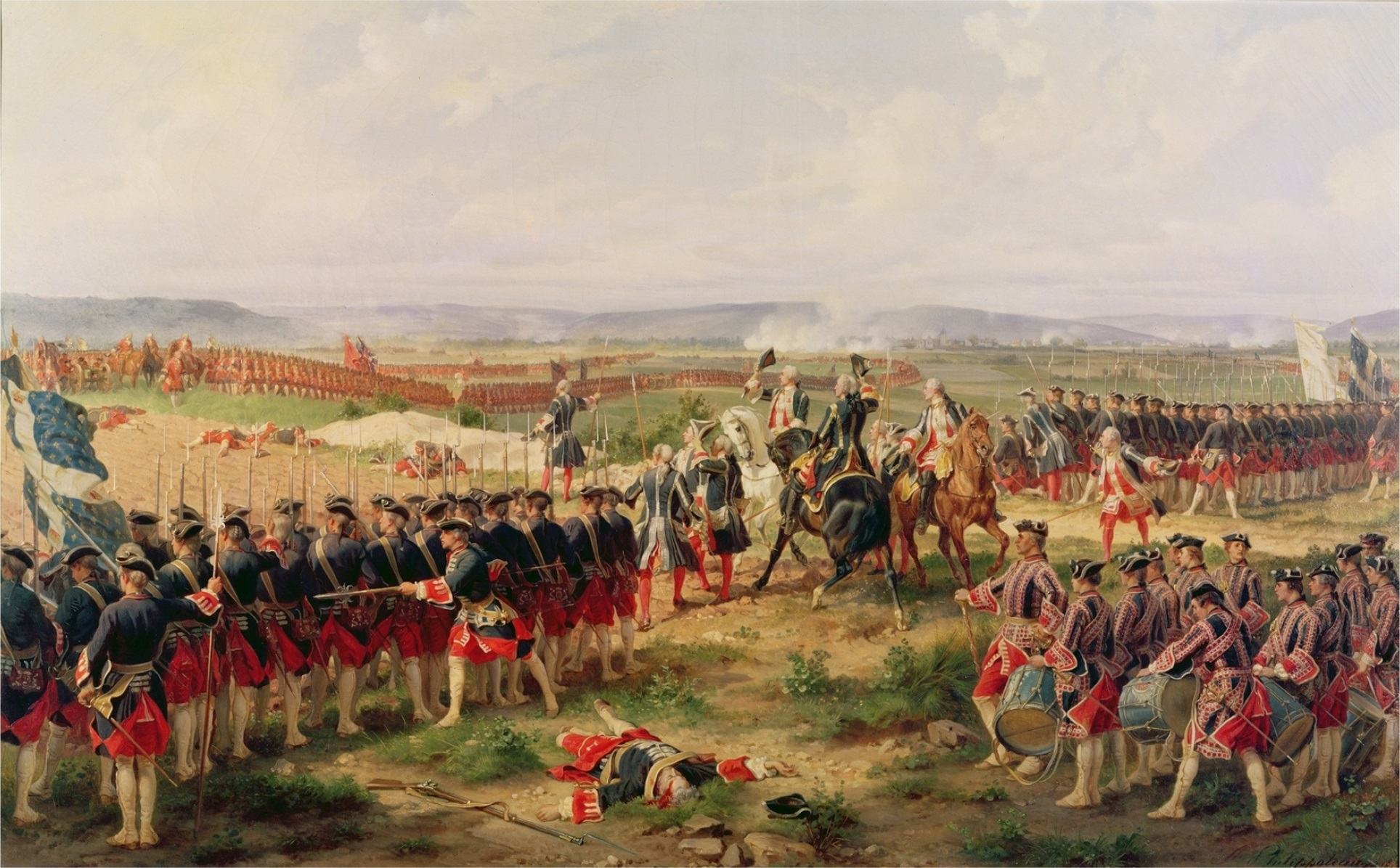
The French Guards Regiment and the British 1st Regiment of Foot Guards invite each other to fire first during the Battle of Fontenoy, 11 May 1745

The new system of linear formations had demonstrated its superiority over the old square system and thus after the end of the Thirty Years' War all other european powers started using the line formation. From the 1680´s until 1700 several further developments were made that increased the combat power of the line infantry. The matchlock was replaced by the flintlock which increased fire power while the invention of the socket bayonet by Vauban made pikemen obsolete.

=== Prussia ===
Frederick the Great made a number of refinements and adaptations in the use of line infantry. When he came to power, the Prussian army already used combat in linear formations to maximize firepower. Infantry generally fought in several ranks, at first closely packed to the extent that soldiers’ arms overlapped. Frederick inherited a four-rank line but reduced it to three ranks in 1740, aiming for a balance between firepower and stability. While wartime shortages sometimes forced the use of only two ranks, Frederick quickly restored three ranks whenever possible. In this arrangement, after each volley, the first rank would kneel and the third rank could fire over them, ensuring all three contributed to the line’s firepower.

Movement in battle was usually organized through open columns of platoons. Frontages and intervals were carefully regulated so that each platoon could wheel and form part of the line of battle. After 1752, maneuvering became more efficient, as sub-units could march directly to their positions in the line before facing the enemy. Before this adjustment, maneuvers involved a more complicated lateral movement that was difficult to execute in practice.

Prussian infantry under Frederick became known for its rapid rate of fire, which could reach up to seven rounds per minute during drill and about half that during combat. Firing was ordinarily conducted in line, with platoon fire generating a rolling volley effect as each platoon fired in succession. Both moving and firing at the same time could be managed, increasing flexibility. However, in the confusion of battle, musketry often devolved into mass volleys rather than carefully timed platoon fire. Frederick initially favored bayonet charges, believing that decisive and rapid advances could overcome enemy resistance. Over time, however, he acknowledged the value of concentrated musket fire, especially as such charges often resulted in heavy losses.

Frederick is especially associated with the use of the oblique order, a formation where the main attack would focus on one of the enemy’s wings. This method was not newly invented by him but he developed it further and applied it successfully. By advancing in echelon formation, with units staggered across the battlefield, Frederick concentrated his forces locally against a weaker part of the enemy line. The rest of the Prussian army was held back, arriving at an angle and providing support as needed.

This tactic allowed Frederick to achieve local numerical superiority and attack from a position of advantage, especially when his army was outnumbered as a whole. These methods required strict discipline and coordination but risked problems if parts of the army acted independently or failed to support the main thrust. Frederick’s approach to line infantry tactics continued to evolve, especially after observing problems in some battles where the oblique order was less effective. By the time of the Seven Years’ War, his troops were well-practiced in its basic principles, and Frederick continually adjusted his tactics based on battlefield experience, always seeking to improve maneuverability, control, and firepower within the linear system.

=== Napoleonic Wars ===
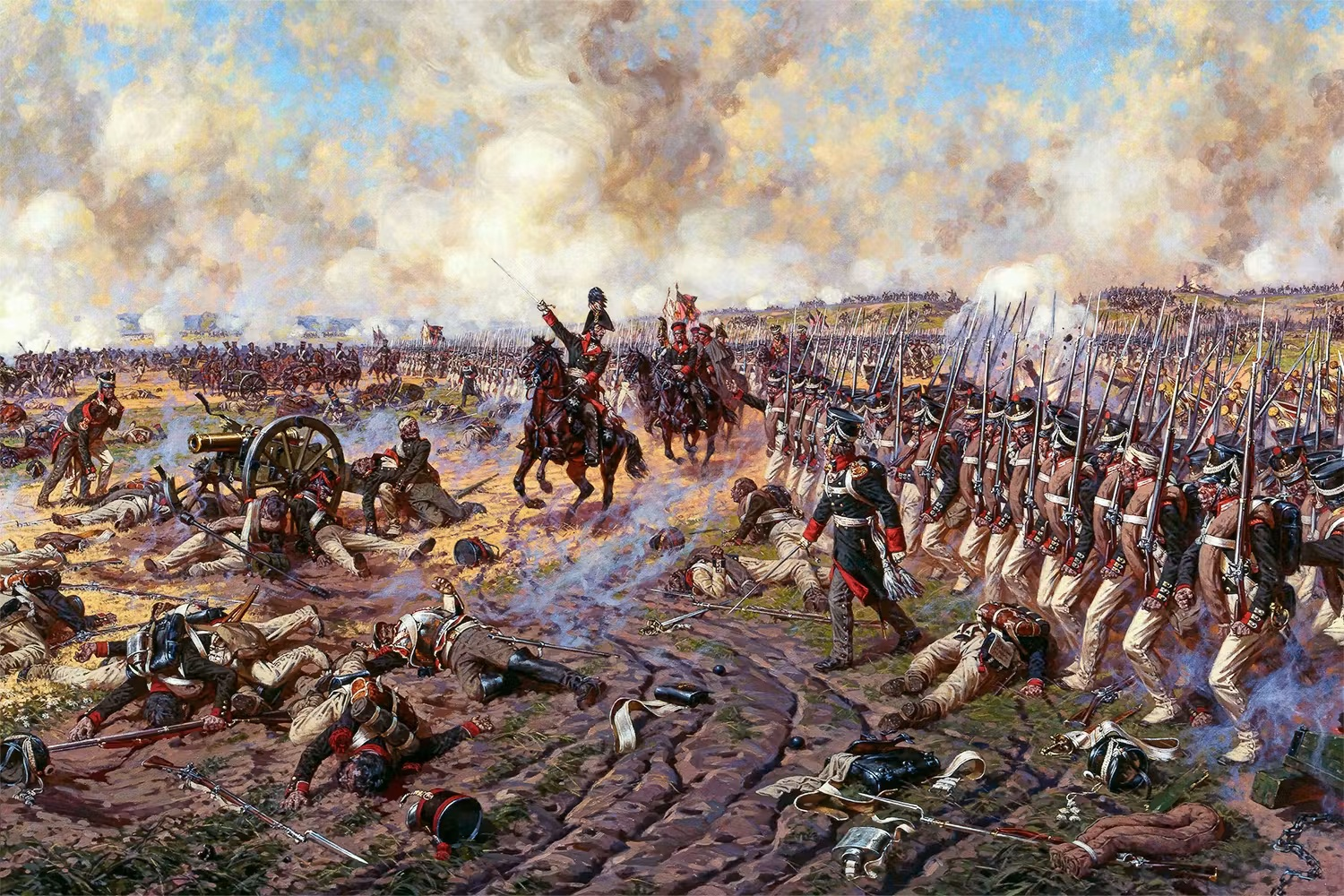
Russian line infantry at the Battle of Borodino

During the Napoleonic Wars, the tactical use and structure of line infantry underwent a series of adaptations to address changing battlefield conditions and technological developments. The line formation, in which soldiers stood shoulder to shoulder three ranks deep, remained the standard method for delivering musket fire and maximizing the forces’ frontage on the battlefield. This arrangement theoretically allowed each man to fire his weapon or use his bayonet effectively, and the rear ranks provided psychological and physical support, especially in response to cavalry threats. However, maintaining a long, well-aligned line proved difficult, particularly when troops needed to advance or maneuver together over uneven ground.

Columns, which were easier to control and moved more efficiently, began to appear more frequently for both movement and some forms of attack. They offered reassurance to less reliable troops, who could take confidence from being closer together, and were often able to break down into firing lines or skirmish formations when needed. Nevertheless, the line was still seen as the ideal formation for maximizing firepower, as specified in various military regulations. The extra men in the additional ranks served both as a reserve and to fill gaps created by casualties. Napoleon Bonaparte experimented with various forms of deployment, such as the "mixed order" (l’ordre mixte), which combined lines and columns within the same formation.

In practice, however, his subordinates rarely adopted this concept when left to their own judgment. Changes in tactical thinking came not only from French command but also from battlefield realities, particularly in Italy, where difficult terrain made traditional lines harder to maintain and compact formations became more common. Other armies made their own adjustments. The British, under commanders like Wellington, favored a two-deep line, which worked well with disciplined troops and accurate musketry, and made extensive use of light infantry and riflemen in both close and open order. British tactics also relied on using terrain for cover, such as deploying troops on reverse slopes to minimize exposure to artillery and musket fire.

Austrian tactics developed towards the use of battalion and division masses, compact formations that could quickly respond to cavalry threats. Austrian commanders deployed thin screens of skirmishers supported by deep, closed-up columns or "masses" behind them. Regulations required that infantry close up to prepare for battle, often forming a "battalion mass" at contact. While such compact formations could resist cavalry charges, they were more vulnerable to artillery fire, so commanders sometimes deployed into line if the artillery threat became severe. As formations grew larger and more troops found themselves in columns or masses, shifting between formations to suit the situation became a key concern. Following reforms after Prussia’s defeat at Jena, Prussian infantry regiments came to include both light and line infantry. Regulations permitted light infantry to fire volleys in two ranks instead of three. This idea spread to the regular line infantry by 1812 as well, especially as practical battlefield experience showed it could deliver effective fire while simplifying control.

== Arms and equipment ==
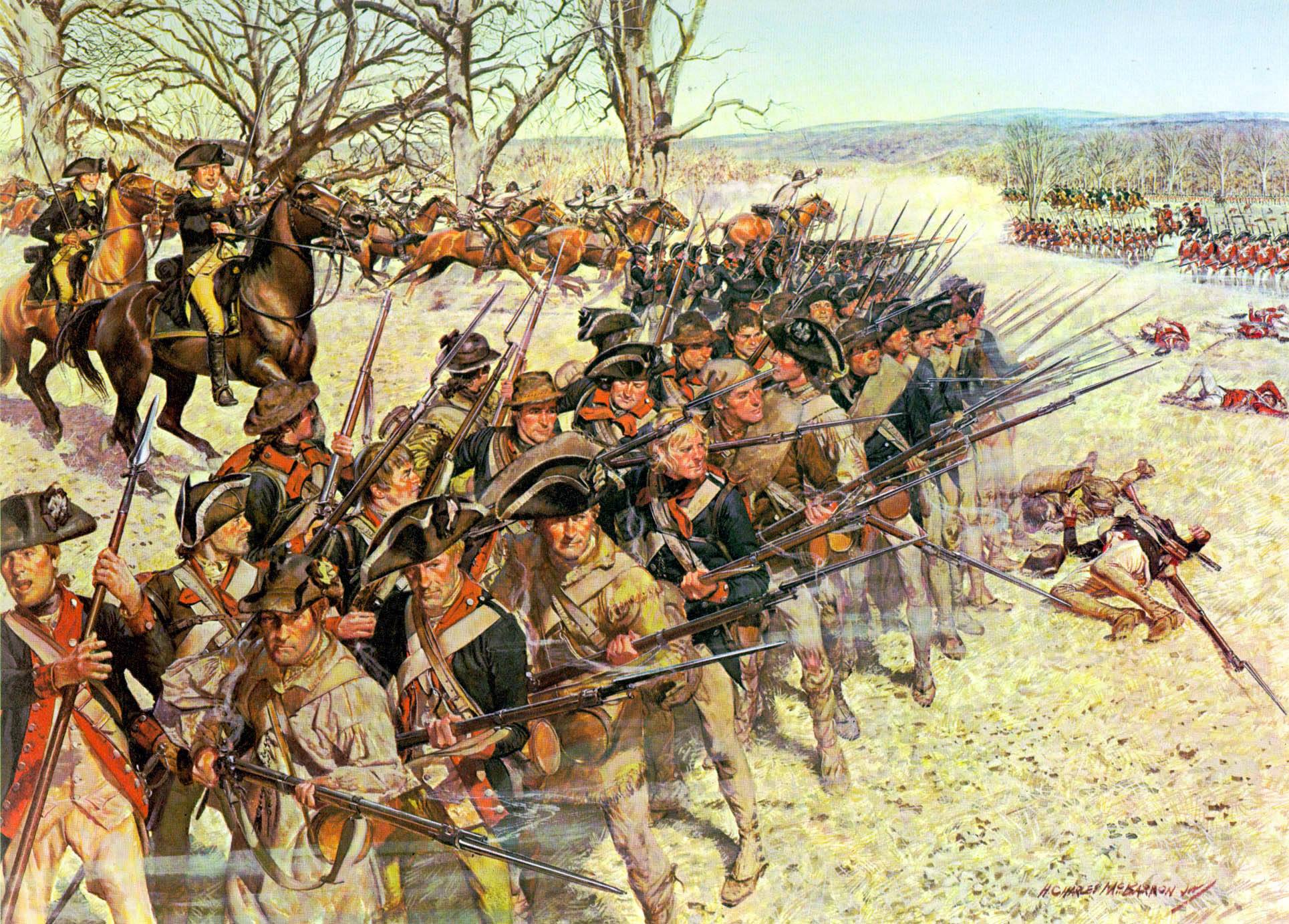
1st Maryland Regiment holding the line at the Battle of Guilford Court House, 1781

In the middle of the 16th century, the matchlock muskets of some line infantry were equipped with bayonets. Bayonets were attached to the muzzles and were used when line troops entered melee combat. They also helped to defend against cavalry.

At the end of the 17th century, the primary weapon of line infantry was the smoothbore musket. Early muskets, such as the matchlock, used a slow-burning match to ignite the powder in the firing pan. This technology limited the rate of fire, and the process was unreliable in bad weather. By the early 18th century, infantry widely adopted the flintlock musket, which generated sparks by striking a piece of flint against steel to ignite the priming powder. The flintlock improved reliability, increased the rate of fire to around two to three rounds per minute under ideal conditions, and remained the standard for most of the 18th century.

Ammunition during this period consisted of round lead balls. Soldiers poured powder into the barrel, followed by the ball and wadding, then rammed the whole charge down with a ramrod. Accuracy was low, with effective ranges generally less than 80 meters, and most firing beyond this range was highly inaccurate. Volleys fired by entire units compensated for individual inaccuracy. By the early 19th century, percussion caps began to replace flintlocks. The percussion cap contained a shock-sensitive compound (such as mercury fulminate) that detonated when struck by the hammer, igniting the main powder charge inside the barrel. This development made ignition more reliable, particularly in wet weather, and further improved the rate of fire.

Despite improvements, these rifles were still muzzleloaders. The next development involved breech-loading rifles and metallic cartridges. The Prussian Dreyse needle gun (Zündnadelgewehr), introduced in the 1840s, was among the first bolt-action rifles using paper cartridges fired by a needle-like firing pin penetrating the cartridge to ignite the primer. This system allowed for much faster reloading, permitting a skilled soldier to fire up to twelve rounds per minute. Further progress came with the adoption of metallic cartridges and improved breech-loading mechanisms. The French Chassepot, introduced in the late 1860s, was a bolt-action rifle using paper cartridges and a rubber-sealed breech.

== Decline ==
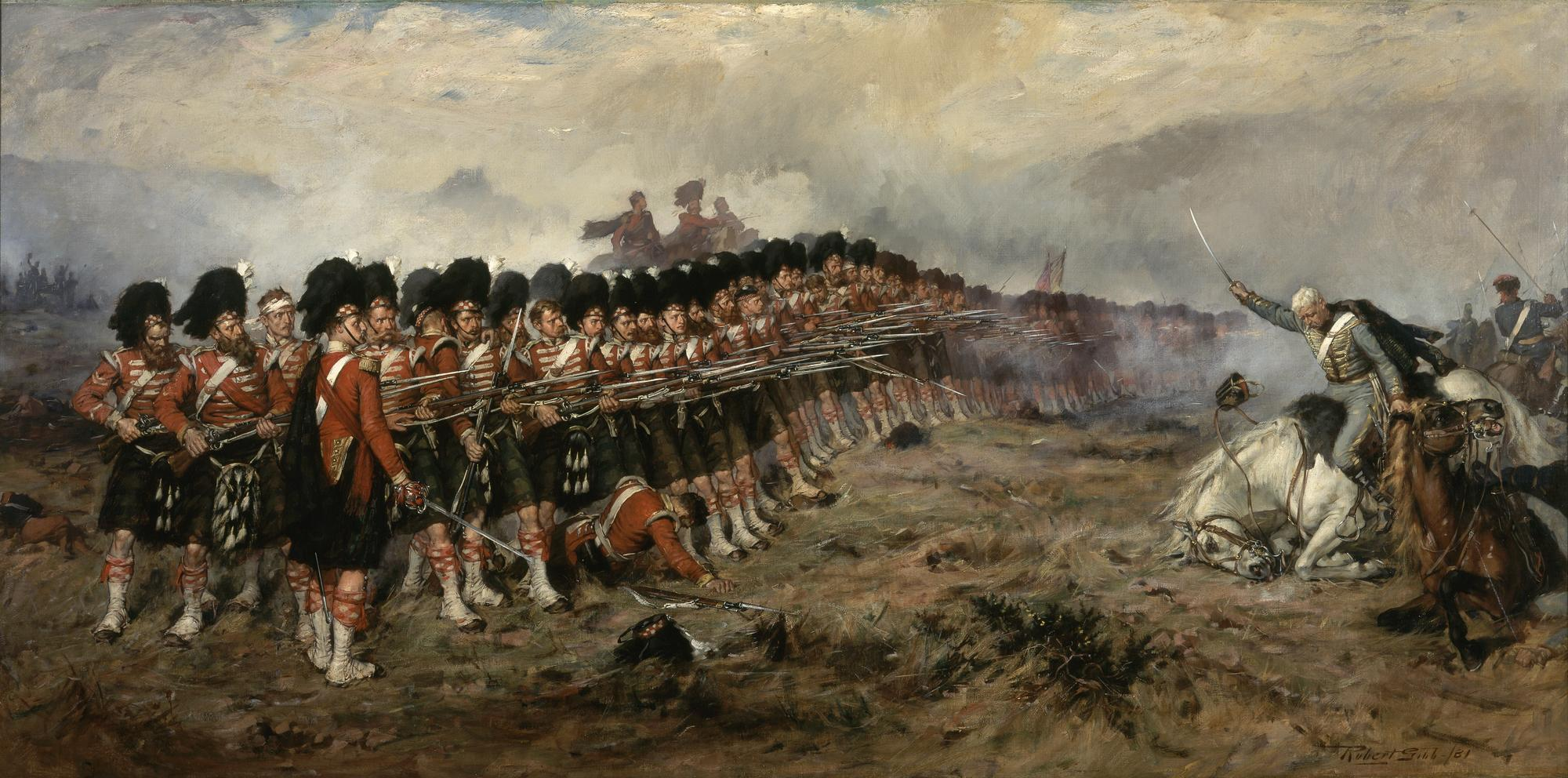
The Thin Red Line at the Battle of Balaclava, where the 93rd Sutherland Highlanders held off Russian cavalry

The introduction of rifled muskets combined with the Minié ball had a considerable effect on line infantry in the mid-19th century. Before the 1850s, rifles were largely reserved for specialized skirmisher units. Their limited widespread use resulted from the challenge of loading a bullet that fit tightly enough to engage the rifled grooves. Residue from repeated firing further complicated their use, making them impractical for general issue to entire infantry units. Technological changes emerged when Claude E. Minie and James H. Burton developed bullets that were both easy to load and would expand to fit the rifling upon firing. The Minie ball, with its hollow base, allowed ordinary soldiers to use rifled muskets as easily as smoothbores. This innovation enabled the adoption of rifled muskets as the standard infantry weapon in many armies, demonstrated by the British and French in the Crimean War and later by both sides in the American Civil War.

Rifling increased the effective range and accuracy of the musket fourfold. While the standard rate of fire slowly increased, reaching up to three rounds per minute,the key change was the ability to hit targets at ranges of several hundred yards. The widespread adoption of the rifled musket outpaced the development of new tactics among commanders. Many officers, trained in the earlier doctrines of close-order lines and massed assaults, continued to deploy their soldiers in dense linear formations. However, the increased range and lethality of rifles meant that attackers suffered greater casualties when advancing against defenders, who could now hit targets well before an assault reached traditional musket range.

As a consequence, the tactical advantage shifted toward the defense. Defenders firing rifles inflicted severe losses on attacking troops long before hand-to-hand combat became possible. Traditional cavalry charges against infantry became almost obsolete, as horses were brought down by gunfire at distances previously considered safe. Artillery, too, lost impact as an offensive tool because cannoneers and teams could be targeted from much further away. Tactical innovation followed battlefield necessity. Infantry formations became looser as soldiers began to advance in widely spaced lines, taking advantage of any available cover and moving by short rushes. This practical adaptation increased individual survival but made controlling units difficult for officers, especially without the means of rapid communication. As a result, close-order assaults persisted in some situations up to the war’s end. The last battles in which line infantry was used took place during the Franco-Prussian War and resulted in massive losses, demonstrating the ineffectiveness of advancing in close formation towards defenders armed with breech-loading rifles firing from the ground.

== See also ==
- Fusilier
- Grenadier
- Line regiment

== Bibliography ==
- Archer, Christon I.; Ferris, John R.; Herwig, Holger H.; Travers, Timothy H. E. (2003). World history of Warfare. London: Cassell. ISBN 0-3043-6352-9.
- Brnardic, Vladimir (2009). Infantry and Artillery. Imperial Armies of the Thirty Years’ War. Vol. I. Oxford: Osprey. ISBN 978-1-84603-447-3.
- Coggins, Jack (2004). Arms and Equipment of the Civil War. Mineola: Dover Publications. ISBN 0-4864-3395-1.
- Duffy, Christopher (1974). The Army of Frederick the Great. New York: Hippocrene Books. ISBN 0-8825-4277-X.
- Griess, Thomas E. (1984). Dawn of Modern Warfare. London: Penguin.
- Haythornthwaite, Philip (1991). Infantry. Frederick The Great's Army. Vol. II. London: Osprey. ISBN 1-8553-2160-2.
- Hofschröer, Peter (1995). Prussian Light Infantry 1792-1815. London: Osprey. ISBN 0-85045-540-5.
- Holmes, Richard, ed. (2001). The Oxford Companion to Military History. Oxford: Oxford University Press. ISBN 0-1986-6209-2.
- Lynn, John A. (2005). Nations in Arms 1763-1815. The Cambridge History of Warfare. Cambridge: Cambridge University Press. ISBN 0-5218-5359-1.
- McPherson, James (1988). Battle Cry of Freedom. New York: Oxford University Press. ISBN 0-1950-3863-0.
- McNab, Chris (2009). Armies of the Napoleonic Wars: An Illustrated History. Oxford: Osprey Publishing. ISBN 978-1-84603-470-1.
- McNab, Chris (2016). The soldier : Discover the Personal Experience of Soldiers throughout the History of Modern Conflict, from the Seven Years' War to the Present Day. Bath: ParragonPublishing. ISBN 978-1-4748-4155-9.
- O'Connell, Robert L. (1990). Of Arms And Men: A History of War, Arms and Aggression. Cambridge: Cambridge University Press. ISBN 0-19-505359-1.
- Parker, Geoffrey (2005). Dynastic War. The Cambridge History of Warfare. Cambridge: Cambridge University Press. ISBN 0-5218-5359-1.
