= Virginia Manufactory of Arms =

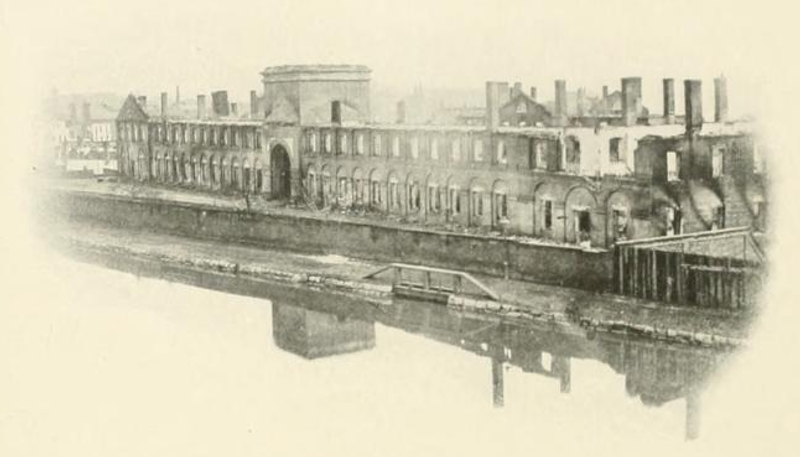
Ruins of the Richmond Arsenal following its destruction in April 1865

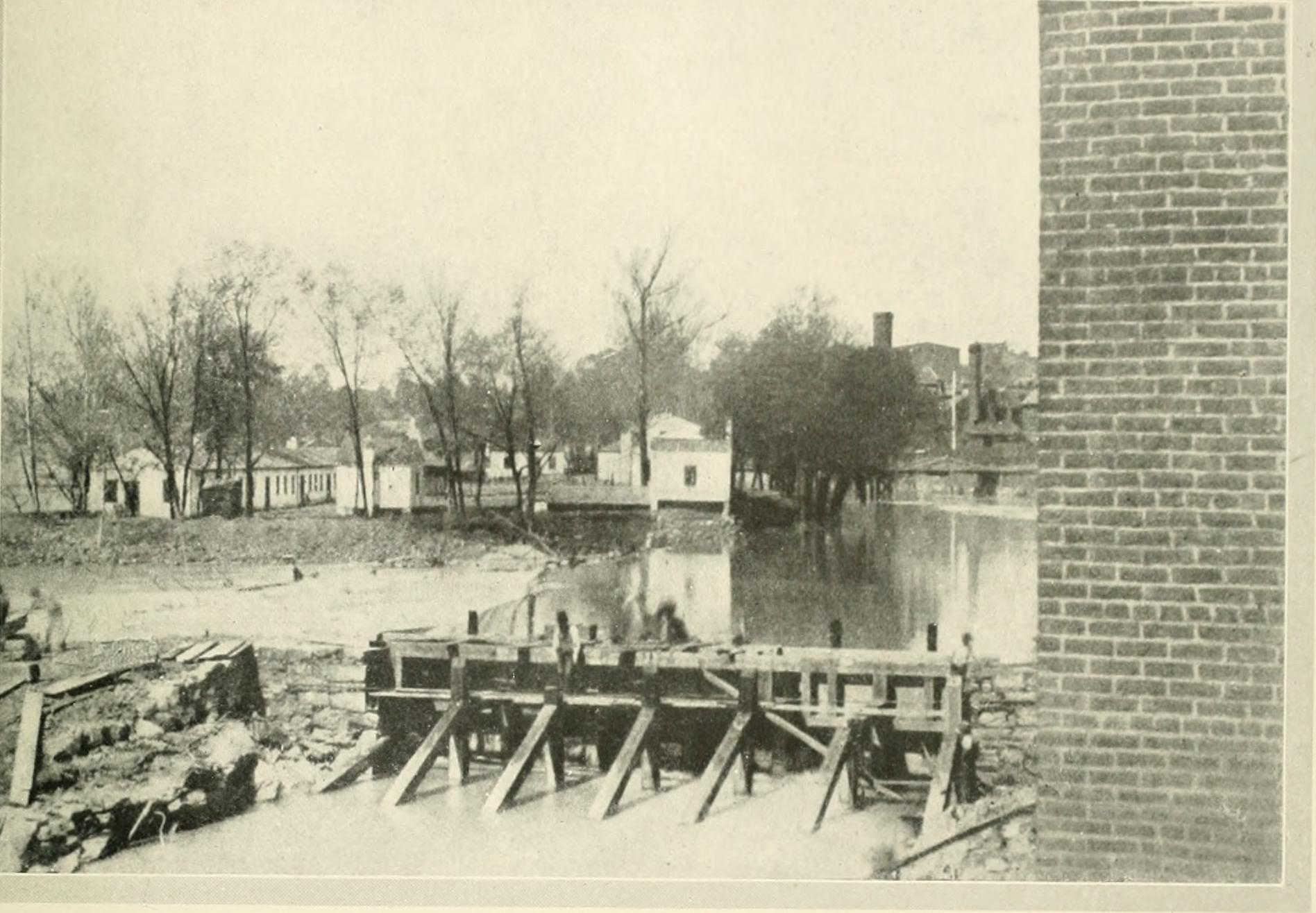
After Union capture; before destruction

The Virginia Manufactory of Arms was a state-owned firearms manufacturer and arsenal in what is today Richmond, Virginia. It was established by the Commonwealth of Virginia in 1798 to supply the Virginia militia with firearms and related items such as swords and bayonets. The factory originally operated from 1802 or 1803 to 1821.

In 1861 at the start of the American Civil War, the works were revived as the Richmond Armory (or Richmond Arsenal), and operated until its destruction in the Evacuation Fire in April 1865.

== History ==
On January 23, 1798, an act of the Virginia General Assembly established the Virginia Manufactory of Arms to ensure a reliable supply of armaments for the state militia. By 1821 when production ceased, other reliable sources of firearms existed like The Virginian manufactured Musketoon features a lock plate dated 1819, and the General Assembly felt production at the armory was no longer necessary, though it retained its storage function.

Richmond Pattern 1797 .70-caliber musket made in 1802

Virginia appropriated funds in January 1860 to modernize the Virginia Manufactory with arms-making machinery manufactured in England; but the confrontation at Fort Sumter initiated the Union blockade which prevented delivery of the machinery. In 1861, the Confederacy captured the Union-held town of Harper's Ferry in northern Virginia, and salvaged the machinery used to manufacture Springfield Model 1855 muskets. The machinery was shipped on the Winchester and Potomac Railroad to Winchester, Virginia, where it was transferred by wagons over the Valley Pike to be reloaded onto the Manassas Gap Railroad at Strasburg, Virginia for delivery to Richmond.

Virginia-made percussion M1860 musket

Under the Militia Act of 1808, the South held approximately 285,000 to 300,000 firearms in state and local stockpiles; while sufficient for limited engagements, these assets were insufficient for a sustained industrial conflict, given the region's lack of the manufacturing capacity, supply chain integration, and logistical framework required to maintain large-scale operations.

From its inception through 1865, the Richmond ordnance facility successfully manufactured, refurbished, and distributed 323,231 infantry firearms, in addition to significant quantities of 34,067 cavalry small arms, 44,877 swords, and sabers, totaling approximately 350,000 rifles and carbines along with own 6,000 revolvers. Furthermore, the facility supplied essential equestrian equipment for the Confederate States.

The Artillery Work Shops generated a production volume of at least 1,375 gun carriages, 875 caissons, 152 forges, and 6,852 artillery sets. Furthermore, the armory manufactured or refurbished approximately 341 Columbiads and siege guns, alongside more than 1,300 field artillery pieces.

Operating with a workforce of approximately 600 personnel, a daily capacity of 200,000 small-arms cartridges and an efficient percussion cap process that could produce 300,000 caps per day. The Confederate States Laboratory on Brown's Island functioned as the primary eastern facility for ammunition production. Its output comprised 1,456,190 friction primers, 1,110,966 fuzes, 17,423 port fires, 3,985 rockets, 72 million small arms cartridges, 146,901,250 percussion caps, and over 921,441 rounds of field, siege, and sea-coast ammunition.

James H. Burton proceeded to accept Confederate production of his patterned bullet. He supervised the production of armaments utilizing confiscated tooling and machinery.

William Leroy Broun served as the captain overseeing the command of the Confederate armory, where he supervised the retrofitting of "Broun Common Shell" rifled cannons, including 20-pound and 30-pound Parrott rifles.

The Old State Armory building with Harpers Ferry Machinery was transferred to Confederate States control in June 1861. Production of Richmond rifles began in October 1861 and continued until the supply of wooden stocks was exhausted in January 1865. The Richmond armory also produced cartridge for buckshot n' pallet ammunition. Following the participation of Captain Turner Ashby and his company in the Confederate seizure of Harpers Ferry, the armory produced approximately 40,000 rifles, carbines, and short rifles to meet the Confederate Army's standard procurement requirements. Around more than 64,000 Confederate copies were manufactured.

Richmond Carbine Factory made approximately 3500 S. C. Robinson pattern carbine under Confederate Government-own facility. The Richmond equipment was moved to Tallassee in 1864 due to its strategic remoteness and access to the Tallapoosa River, offering protection from Union attacks and a reliable power source. Although Confederate forces captured a large number of Spencer breech-loading rifles, they could not issue them because they lacked the specialized ammunition required; a plan was proposed at the Richmond Arsenal to increase the accuracy and range of smooth-bore muskets already in Confederate possession, similar to the Nessler ball.

Most of the facility was destroyed during the Evacuation Fire of 1865. The rolling mills survived destruction, and became part of the Tredegar Iron Works after the war, remained in operation before 1960. Portions of the main arsenal building survived in ruins into the late 19th century, until finally being demolished in 1900.

== See also ==
- Fayetteville rifle
- Tallassee cavalry carbine
- Bellona Arsenal
