= Williams cleaner bullet =

Three types of projectiles

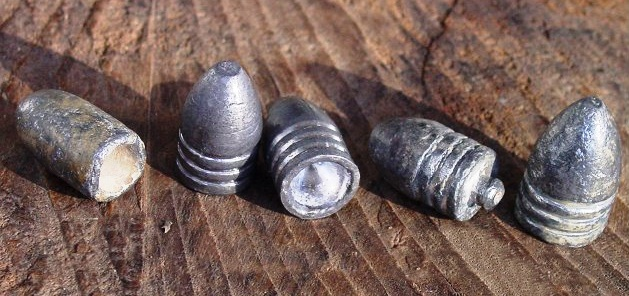
Various musket balls including (second from the right) a Williams bullet

The Williams cleaner bullet, also known as "cleaner bullets", refers to three different types of bullets that were used by the Union Army during the American Civil War in the standard .58 caliber rifle muskets. There was a fourth developed for use in the Union Repeating or "Coffee-Mill" gun. The inventor was Elijah D. Williams of Philadelphia, Pennsylvania, who filed an application for his patent on May 30, 1861. It was issued almost a year later, on May 13, 1862, but field trials on his "improved" bullet had already begun.

The concept of the design was that the discharge of the musket would drive the concave disks forward thus expanding the lead bullet against the interior walls of the rifled barrel earlier in the barrel than a bullet like the various plugless Minié types of bullets. Those took time to expand causing more gas to escape before a perfect seal was made and causing an accumulation of fouling at the base of the barrel. The idea of the Williams bullet was that the sealing by expansion of the skirt of the bullet happened earlier, solving these issues. Hence the ”cleaner bullet” nickname, often misunderstood as a kind of ”cleaning bullet” added at the end of the 10 bullet package. One issue with the bullet was that a too forceful ramming may cause an expansion of the soft lead bullet inside the barrel before firing, making it very hard to remove with a worm added on the ramrod, when trying to unload the rifle after sentry duty.

== Models ==
Type I bullets have a central post and two zinc disks with six slits. Type I cartridges can be found in both tan and blue cartridge paper. Type II and III's have a zinc base "plunger" (similar to a flat washer), and one disk without slits. Type II cleaner cartridges can be found in both white and tan cartridge paper. Type III cartridges can be found in red, blue and tan cartridge paper. Type III bullets are also the shorter of the three designed for rifle muskets. The fourth type for the "Coffee Mill" gun looks like the standard Type III at first, but is slightly larger in diameter.

According to "Round Ball to Rim Fire part 1" by Dean S. Thomas, in 1863 there is also mention of a .69 caliber version of the Williams bullet, but none were ever purchased by the US Ordnance Department.

At first, the standard package of ten arsenal-issued cartridges contained eleven percussion caps in a separate tube and one Williams patent cartridge out of the 10 cartridges. Later this amount was increased to three of the 10 and then to six by August 1864. Originally Soldiers were instructed to use the special bullets as every tenth round fired.

Williams cartridges were made up in the same fashion as the standard .58 caliber cartridge with 60 grains of black powder, but no official documentation has ever been located indicating that the cartridges should be made up in a colored cartridge paper. Surviving examples show blue, red, green and a white / off white cartridge paper used along with the standard "buff" tan cartridge paper in their production.

- Most of the information above can be found in the Dean S. Thomas book "Round Ball to Rim Fire -Part 1" chapter 13 pages 211–243 on Civil War Small Arms ammunition. Mr. Thomas is considered the foremost authority on Civil War small arms ammunition.
- For further information, consult Civil War Projectiles II by Mason and McKee, or "Round Ball to Rim Fire-Part 1" by Dean S. Thomas - 1997.
