= Obturation =

Seal created by deformation

Obturation is the necessary barrel blockage or fit in a firearm or airgun created by a deformed soft projectile. A bullet or pellet made of soft material and often with a concave base will flare under the heat and pressure of firing, filling the bore and engaging the barrel's rifling. The mechanism by which an undersized soft-metal projectile enlarges to fill the barrel is, for hollow-base bullets, expansion from gas pressure within the base cavity and, for solid-base bullets, "upsetting"—the combined shortening and thickening that occurs when a malleable metal object is struck forcibly at one end.

Obturation is achieved in shotgun shells (which have multiple pellets much smaller than the barrel bore) by placing a plastic wad or biodegradable card of the same diameter as the barrel between the propellant powder and the pellets.

In a cartridge—such as a bullet or cased artillery shell—"obturation" is initiated by the action of a soft metallic cartridge case being pressed outwards against the chamber walls by the high pressure of the internal gases. This creates a self-sealing effect that prevents gasses from leaking out of the breech mechanism. The difficulty with leakage was one of the major obstacles to the early adoption of the breech-loading firearm, as it lowered pressures (and hence velocity), and also created danger or irritant to the shooter. Although there were early paper-cartridge breechloaders, the self-obturating nature of metallic cartridges (along with their waterproof nature) led to their rapid and almost universal adoption, in spite of their much greater cost, solving as they did the leakage problem without requiring a complex built-in sealing system.

Artillery shells rely on a driving band—a band of soft metal built into the shell casing near its base—to provide a seal between the barrel and projectile. Where the propellant charge is not enclosed in a cartridge, the breech itself must be fitted with an obturating mechanism, usually the de Bange obturator whereby a metal "nose cone" at the front of the breech screw compresses what was originally a grease-impregnated asbestos ring. This ring consequently expands sideways against the barrel wall and provides the required gas seal.

== Obturation in firearms ammunition ==
Obturation in firearms and air guns is the result of a bullet or pellet expanding or upsetting to fit the bore, or, in the case of a firearm, of a brass case expanding to seal against the chamber at the moment of firing. In the first case, this both seals the bullet in the bore, and causes the bullet to engage the barrel's rifling. In the second case, it seals the case in the chamber and prevents backward travel of gases against the bolt. The thin brass case easily seals the chamber, even in low pressure rounds like the .22 CB, but expanding or upsetting the bullet sufficiently for effective obturation requires sufficient pressure to deform the bullet material. The formula used to calculate the pressure required for solid base bullets is:

Material	BHN	Pressure	
Material	BHN	(psi)	(MPa)
Pure lead	5	7,110	49
1:20 tin/lead	10	14,200	98
1:10 tin/lead	11.5	16,400	113
Pure copper	40	56,900	392

Bullet's Brinell hardness number (BHN) x 9.80665 N/kgf×10^{6} mm²/m² = [N/m²] = pressure in pascals

Bullet's BHN x 1,422 = pressure in pounds per square inch

The conversion factor of 1,422 is mathematically derived in order to convert the pressure in kgf/mm^{2} (the units used to measure BHN) to lbf/in^{2} (the units used to measure cartridge pressure). That is:

Conversion factor = 25.4 (mm/in) x 25.4 (mm/in) x 2.2046 (lbf/kgf) ≈ 1,422.

Note that this number should only be used with cast lead plain-base bullets. It does not apply to jacketed or gas-check cast bullets. Below is a chart containing various bullet alloys, the BHN, and the PSI required to expand a bullet to the bore:

Pure lead is very soft, and can be expanded or upset by most firearm cartridges, but the pressures required are higher than those encountered in most airguns. To allow obturation in airguns, pellets use soft alloys or flexible polymers in conjunction with a thin, concave base designed to expand more easily. Some airgun projectiles are composed of materials harder than the soft alloys traditionally relied upon; these instead commonly make use of elastomer rings capable of providing sufficient obturation under pressure. Some firearms ammunition, such as Foster slugs and hollow base wadcutter bullets, also use a hollow base to allow the bullet to expand and conform to a barrel's irregularities, even as the chamber pressure drops as the bullet travels down the barrel (see internal ballistics). For example, it is not uncommon for revolver barrels to have a slight constriction at the breech end where they thread into the revolver's frame; a hollow base bullet will expand to fill the larger diameter of the barrel after passing through the constriction.

To prevent excessive deformation in high pressure rifle and magnum pistol cartridges, lead bullets are often covered in copper or another harder alloy. These bullets are generally designed to be compressed upon firing as they leave the chamber and enter barrel. This seals the bullet to the interior of the barrel and engages the rifling.

The same principles apply to artillery ammunition; guns are traditionally categorized (in English-speaking countries) as "BL" or "QF" (for "Breechloading" or "Quick Firing"). "BL" guns are the older style, and typically use propellant stored in a number of fabric bags, the number of which can be adjusted to vary the range in some cases, as well as a separate shell that is rammed before the powder charge is placed into the breech. Large-caliber naval guns are traditionally of the "BL" type. Lacking a cartridge case to seal the breech, these guns require a complex and strong breech mechanism to safely seal the breech during firing. "QF" guns were a later development, usually of small to medium caliber, and came about from the need for rapid firing guns to counter torpedo boats and other small, nimble threats. A QF gun fires metallic-cased ammunition, generally with the shell fixed to it, as a single unit, just like a firearm cartridge. This allows a simpler breech mechanism, such as a sliding block breech, which when coupled with the easier ammunition handling and ramming procedures, allows a much higher rate of fire. Larger guns are most often BL guns, because the ammunition is so large and heavy that adding a metallic cartridge case would add a great deal of weight and make handling more difficult, even if the shell and propellant were loaded separately. There have been exceptions, however; some German naval guns during WWII used fabric powder bags with a thin brass base section, to provide obturation to the breech without adding too much weight, similar to a modern plastic shotshell with a "low-brass" base for sealing and extraction.

== See also ==
- Charles Ragon de Bange
- Broadwell ring
- Driving band
- Fire forming
- Fluting
- Gas check
- Minié ball
- Obturating ring
- Glossary of firearms terminology
