= Rocket Ball =

19th century firearm cartridge design

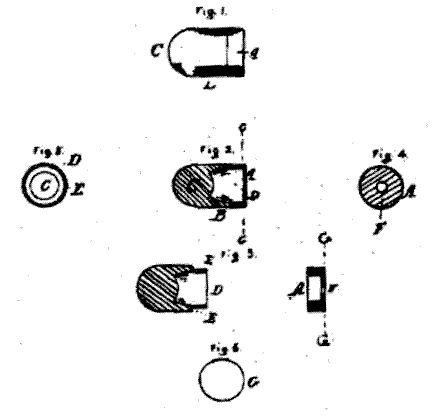
Drawing from US patent 5,701, for Walter Hunt's Rocket Ball metallic cartridge

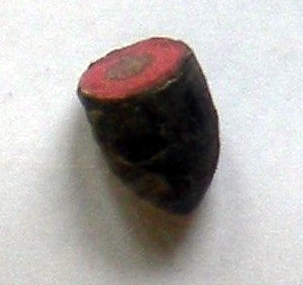
Early Volcanic cartridge cal .41

The Rocket Ball was one of the earliest forms of metallic cartridge for firearms, containing bullet and powder in a single, metal-cased unit.

== Construction ==
The Rocket Ball, patented in 1848 by Walter Hunt, consisted of a lead bullet with a deep hollow in the rear, running a majority of the length of the cartridge. The hollow, like that of the Minie ball, served to seal the bullet into the bore, but the Rocket Ball put the cavity to further use. By packing the deep cavity with powder, and sealing it with a cap with a small hole in the rear for ignition, the Rocket Ball replaced the earlier paper cartridge with a durable package capable of being fed from a magazine. The cap was blown out of the bore upon firing. The Rocket Ball was used in magazine-fed, lever-action guns, allowing the first easily manufactured repeating single chamber firearms.

== Use ==
While the Rocket Ball provided the means of making practical repeating firearms, it was not an ideal solution. The limited volume in the base of the bullet severely limited the amount of powder that could be used, and thus limited the potential velocity and range of the cartridge. With muzzle energy of only about 56 foot-pounds (76 joules), the Rocket Ball was less powerful than even the most feeble of modern "pocket pistol" cartridges, such as .25 ACP and .32 ACP.

Despite these limitations, the Rocket Ball was used in a number of attempts at making a commercially successful firearm, culminating in the Volcanic Repeating Arms Company. The Volcanic cartridge went one step further, adding a primer to the cap of the Rocket Ball, making the ammunition completely self-contained.

Due to the deficiencies of the Rocket Ball, and possibly also due to limited availability of the ammunition, many of the Jennings and Smith Jennings rifles were converted to muzzle-loading percussion arms. Both factory and independent conversions were common. All observed conversions to muzzle loading involve removing the bolt and associated components, installing a breech block with a percussion nipple in the rear of the barrel, and modifying the hammer for use with the percussion nipple. Hammer modification involved the removal of the long nose. This muzzle loading conversion involving percussion priming, has led to misinformation about the use of percussion caps with the Rocket Ball. All observed rifles still configured to use Rocket Ball also use mercury fulminate pill priming.

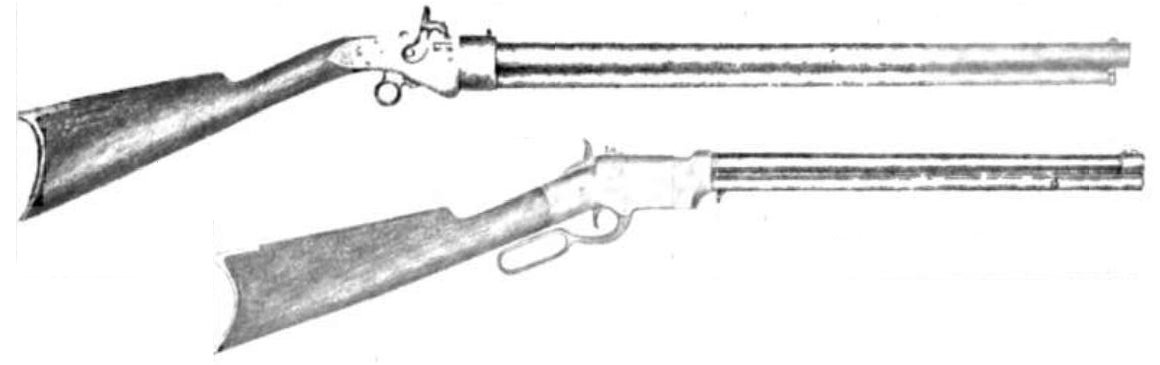
The Jennings rifle, top, shows the long nosed hammer needed for the Rocket Ball's mercury fulminate pill priming, separate from the Rocket Ball. The later Volcanic rifle, bottom, used the internally primed Volcanic cartridge

== See also ==
- Pinfire cartridge
- Nessler ball
