= Hollow-base bullet =

Firearm bullet with a pit in its base

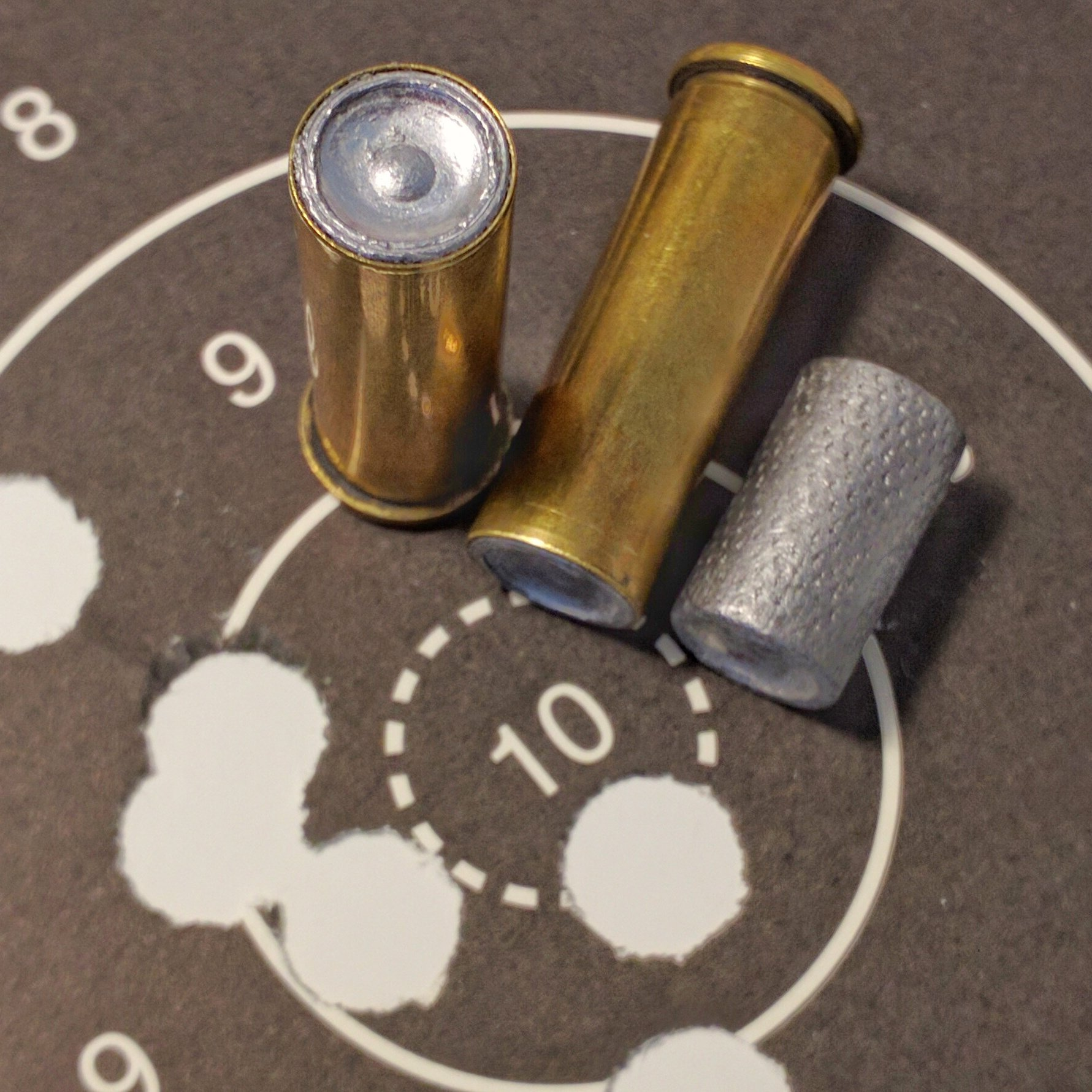
.38 special wadcutters. On the right is an unloaded 148 grain hollow-base wadcutter bullet.

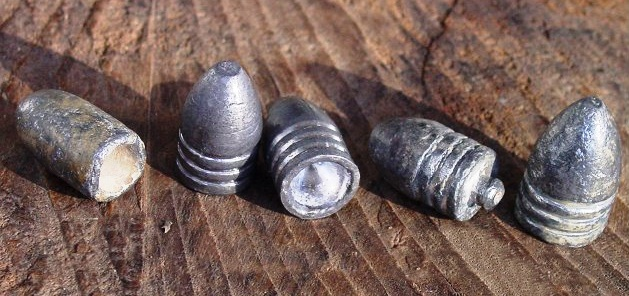
From left to right: .577 Enfield Minie Bullet, Burton Pattern Minie Bullets, .58 Springfield (x 2), Williams Bullet missing zinc base, .69 Caliber Minie Bullet. Tamisier grooves are visible.

A hollow-base bullet is a firearm bullet with a pit or hollow in its base which expands upon being fired, forcing the base to engage with the barrel grooves and obturating the bore more as the bullet travels through the barrel. Hollowing the base makes the bullet more front-heavy, which improves aerodynamic stability and accuracy.

== History ==
Two men have been credited with the invention of the hollow-base bullet: Captain Claude-Étienne Minié of the French Army and William Greener. The initial reason for developing a hollow-base bullet was to improve usability and performance of muzzle-loading rifles using black powder propellant.

== See also ==
- Hollow-point bullet
- Minié ball
- Tamisier
- Nessler ball
