= Wadcutter =

Type of bullet

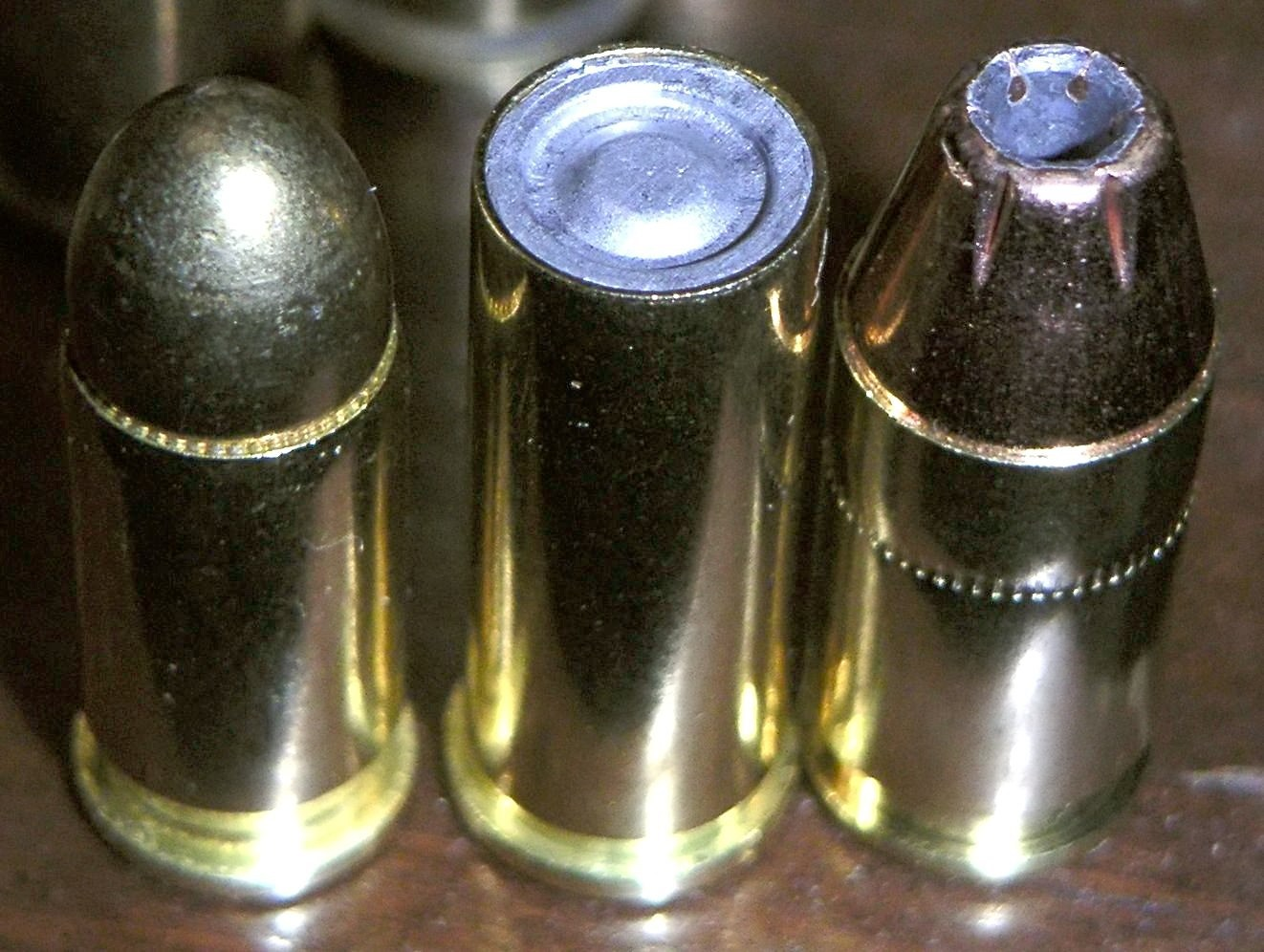
.32 ACP full metal jacket, .32 S&W Long wadcutter, .380 ACP jacketed hollow point (L-R)

A wadcutter is a special-purpose flat-fronted bullet specifically designed for shooting paper targets, usually at close range and at subsonic velocities typically under approximately 270 metres per second (890 ft/s). Wadcutters have also found favor for use in self-defense guns, such as .38 caliber snubnosed revolvers, due to shorter barrel lengths, lower bullet velocities, and improved lethality. Wadcutters are often used in handgun and airgun competitions.

== Bullet profile ==
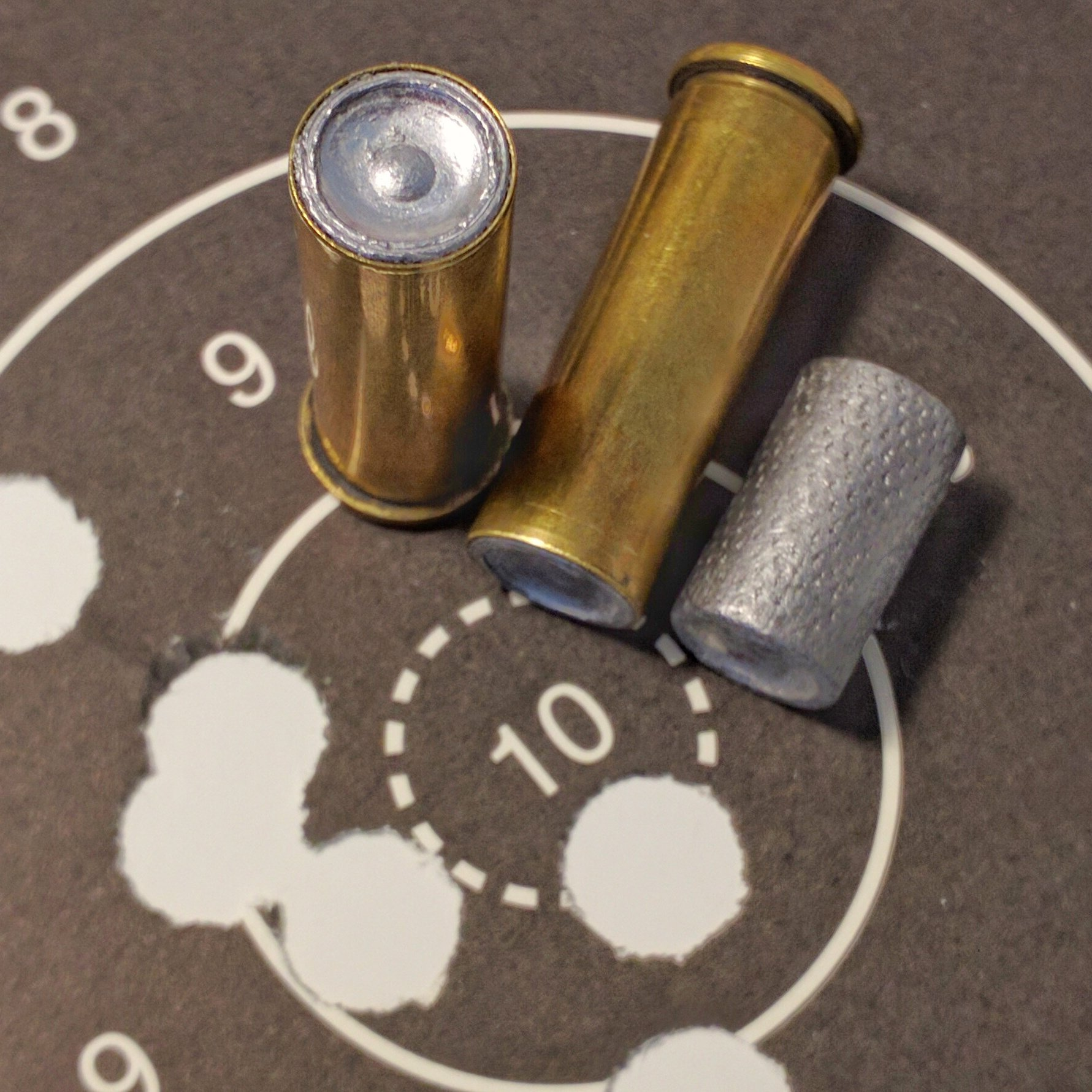
.38 Special wadcutters loaded cartridges, 148 grains (9.6 g) hollow-base wadcutter bullet and target showing the clean round holes

A wadcutter has a flat or nearly flat front that is typically as wide as the caliber size or only slightly smaller in diameter than caliber size. For target shooting, a wadcutter cuts a very clean hole through the paper target, making it easier to score and ideally reducing errors in scoring the target in the favor of the shooter. Because the flat nosed bullet is not well suited for feeding out of a magazine, wadcutters are normally used in revolvers or in specially designed semi-automatic pistols, such as the Smith & Wesson Model 52. Although this is not always the case, as some wadcutters may have rounded bullet nose profiles.

== Types of firearm wadcutters ==
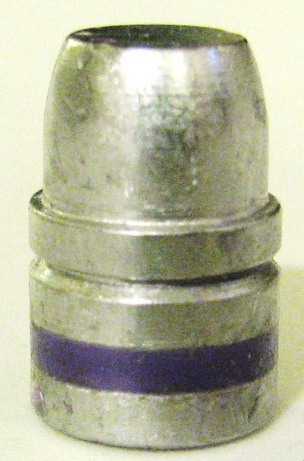
Keith-style SWC with one crimping groove and one filled lubrication groove. In practice, the bullet can be crimped over the leading band, or on the crimping groove, as desired.

A variety of wadcutter types exist: HBWC (Hollow Base Wadcutter), DEWC (Double-ended wadcutters), BBWC (Beveled-Base Wadcutters), and SWC (Semi-Wadcutters). HBWC rounds are best used at only the lowest velocities, as by being hollow at the rear end, they can split under heavy loads. DEWC rounds are best suited for automatic press reloading uses, as they may be used when loaded with either end pointed forward. BBWC have been developed to permit easier bullet insertion into the case when reloading. SWC rounds were developed to permit them to be loaded in either semi-automatic pistols or revolvers, where the rounded bullet shape often works better with feed ramps on semi-automatic pistols, and they are often used for heavy loads intended either for hunting or for self-defense. Some SWC bullet designs have a smaller diameter rear end, making these bullets suitable for use with gas checks. Properly lubricated SWC bullets with gas checks are suitable for use at velocities exceeding 1,700 feet per second (520 m/s), the gas check reducing leading within the bore.

=== Accuracy ===
The maximum accurate distance of wadcutters varies considerably with the shape of the front of the bullet. Full caliber diameter wadcutters are suitable for use only at short ranges, typically not being used at ranges exceeding 25 yards (23 m) where accuracy is especially desirable. At distances beyond 50 yards (46 m), full caliber diameter wadcutters become highly inaccurate. On the other hand, SWC bullets can maintain high accuracy at ranges exceeding 100 yards (91 m). In general, semi-wadcutters having a partially rounded nose are more accurate than wadcutters having a flat-front profile. In contrast, flat-front profile wadcutters tend to have improved lethality for hunting or self-defense purposes.

=== Lubrication and bullet crimping ===
Lead wadcutters require proper lubrication to prevent leading (buildup of lead deposits) of rifling and forcing cones when used in firearms. With proper lubrication, no leading for solid lead wadcutters occurs until velocities exceed approximately 940 feet per second (290 m/s). Without proper lubrication, however, severe leading can occur quickly, in as few as a couple of rounds. Most DEWC, BBWC, HBWC, and SWC bullets have one or more lubrication grooves, with or without an additional one or two crimping grooves. Having two crimping grooves is sometimes seen in dual-use bullets, such as intended for use with both .38 Special and .357 Magnum cartridges, or, similarly, for use with both .44 Special and .44 Magnum cartridges, in instances where overall cartridge lengths may need to be set differently so as to achieve the highest accuracy. Used in revolvers, wadcutters must be roll crimped. Used in semi-automatic pistols, wadcutters must be taper crimped. Used in single-shot firearms (e.g., Thompson Center Contender or Encore), no crimping is absolutely required, but higher velocities may be achieved with either a roll or taper crimp, depending on cartridge, to permit pressure to rise higher before the bullet is released from the brass case.

=== Indoor wadcutters ===
Wadcutter bullets for center-fire firearms often have a modified profile with a reduced-diameter central point or rounded section. This was developed to allow the use of wadcutter bullets without causing excessive damage to the rubber anti-splashback curtain on indoor ranges. This profile produces a clean cut without tearing of the paper on the paper target for scoring but will only partially deform a rubber curtain and rebound before penetrating enough to cut the surface of the rubber mat.

=== Bullet loading techniques ===
Wadcutters can be loaded flush with the brass case opening or they may be set to extend out of the brass case, depending on what provides the most accuracy; the desired powder capacity of the case; or other desired criteria. Both varieties of wadcutters (flush, or non-flush) are commercially available. Although primarily intended for target practice, wadcutters can be used for close-in self-defense and hunting because their sharp edges and close-range accuracy are claimed to increase lethality.

== Leading effects ==
Wadcutters are typically made from lead. Deposition of lead into the rifling grooves of barrels and into the forcing cones of revolvers limits the maximum usable velocity of wadcutters to less than about 900 ft/s. A modern solution to leading at higher velocities is powder coating the lead projectile, encasing it in a protective shell. Shots fired at higher velocities may cause severe leading of the rifling and of the forcing cone, introducing a potentially dangerous condition from overpressure if full metal jacket bullets are subsequently fired without first removing the lead buildup. Mechanical and/or chemical means may be employed to remove the lead buildup caused by shooting wadcutters at excessive velocity.

== Air rifle and pistol wadcutters ==
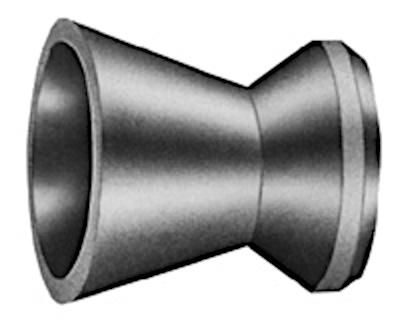
A typical 4.5 mm (.177 in) match diabolo air gun pellet, in the HBWC (Hollow Base Wadcutter) configuration

Target airguns used for 10 metre air rifle and 10 metre air pistol competitions generally shoot wadcutter pellets at muzzle velocities around 570 ft/s (170 m/s). The use of wadcutter match diabolo pellets is nearly universal in airgun target shooting where paper targets are used, at distances of 25 metres (27 yd) or less.

== See also ==
- Elmer Keith
- Semiwadcutter
- Smith & Wesson Model 52
