= Nessler ball =

Muzzle-loading musket bullet

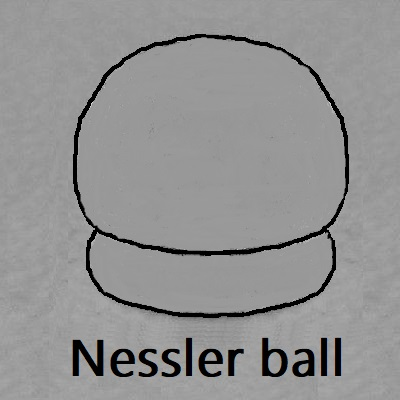
Nessler ball sketch.

The Nessler ball, or balle Nessler, is a type of muzzle-loading musket bullet. It was developed to increase the accuracy and range of smoothbore muskets and was used in the Crimean War. The design was invented by Neissler, a Belgian colonel and head of the Vincennes Rifle School. It featured a short conical-cylindrical soft lead bullet, with a conical hollow in its base. The ammunition was supplied to the armed forces of Russia, France, and Sardinia-Piedmont. The bullet was designed with a lead skirting, whose purpose was to expand under the pressure and obturate the barrel and increase muzzle velocity. The bullet could be quickly removed from a paper cartridge with the gunpowder poured down the barrel and the bullet pressed past the muzzle. It was then rammed home with the ramrod, which ensured that the charge was packed and the hollow base was filled with powder. When fired, the expanding gas pushed forcibly on the base of the bullet, deforming it to form a better seal for consistent velocity, longer range, and accuracy. A similar ball design called the Chace ball (after its inventor W. B. Chace) was developed in 1861 in the United States but was not adopted. A variant of the Nessler bullet was manufactured in North Carolina foundries, with over 1.5 million produced for Confederate troops, primarily for use in outdated smoothbore muskets such as the Springfield Model 1816, with production overseen by the North Carolina Institute for the Deaf, Dumb, and Blind. Nessler caliber is often mistaken for slug rounds. The 1857 model bullet was replaced with a 36-gram bullet with a quadrangular cavity and remarkable accuracy for M1859 carbine and possibly Springfield Model 1822, differed from the infantry M1842T rifle primarily in its rifled barrel. It was designed for lethal fire at distances inaccessible to muskets, which were the last smoothbore arms that fired either standard round balls or the semi-spherical Nessler ball, designated the model 1858 ball. It was later deployed by French force in Mexico campaign (1861-1867). Sardinia likely equipped Nessler ammo for the Model 1844 smoothbore used by Cacciatori delle Alpi in the conquest of Marche and Umbria.

== See also ==
- Minié ball
- Rocket ball
