= James H. Burton =

Confederate Army officer (1823–1894)

James Henry Burton
- Born: James Henry Burton; August 17, 1823; Shenandoah Spring, Virginia
- Died: October 18, 1894 (aged 71); Winchester, Virginia
- Occupations: gunsmith, inventor
- Spouse(s): Cornelia Mauzy, Elizabeth Evering Keller, Eugenia Harper Mauzy

James H. Burton (August 17, 1823 – October 18, 1894) was a Confederate soldier during the American Civil War.

He was born in Shenandoah Spring, Virginia. Educated at the Westchester Academy in Pennsylvania, Burton entered a Baltimore machine shop at age 16. In April 1844, he went to work at the Harpers Ferry Armory, serving as a machinist. He subsequently served as Foreman of the Rifle Factory Machine Shop, where he gained a considerable amount of knowledge and respect for the work of John H. Hall. Hall pioneered mechanized arms production and interchangeable manufacture at Harpers Ferry between 1820 and 1840. According to Burton, Hall's Rifle Works housed "not an occasional machine, but a plant of milling machinery by which the system and economy of the manufacture was materially altered." During the next three decades, Burton followed Hall's example by furthering the mechanization of arms production.

== The Minié Bullet ==
In 1849, Burton was promoted to Acting Master Armorer. During the next four years, Burton experimented with improved designs for the Minié bullet at Harpers Ferry. The Minié bullet, introduced in 1848 by Captain Claude-Étienne Minié of the French Army, was a conical slug of lead slightly more than half an inch in diameter and about an inch long, with a hollow base which expanded when the rifle was fired. This prevented leakage of the powder gases, and served to expand the base of the bullet outward into the riflings of the gun barrel. Its effective range was from 200 to 250 yards – a significant improvement over previous bullets.

In 1854, Southern Democrats, under the leadership of Secretary of War Jefferson Davis, orchestrated the removal of James H. Burton from his role as master armorer at Harpers Ferry.

Burton carefully documented his work in a set a detailed drawings. These drawings show that he was experimenting with several different Minié bullet designs. According to Colonel Benjamin Huger of the Ordnance Department, Burton was studying the "tige" and Minié principles (the "tige" bullet had a steel stem designed to expand the bullet into the weapon's rifling). Burton designed a barrel which used a hard metal plug to expand the bullet into the rifling, and developed a hollow-base bullet design that worked even better. In 1855, Burton's modified design for the Minié bullet was adopted by the United States Army.

== James Burton at the Enfield Armory ==
In 1854, Burton left Harpers Ferry to take a job with the Ames Manufacturing Company of Chicopee, Massachusetts, which supplied both federal armories (Harpers and Springfield) with precision machinery for the manufacture of firearms. Just one year later, in June 1855, Burton accepted a five-year contract as Chief Engineer of the Royal Small Arms Manufactory in Enfield Lock, England. Here, Burton was responsible for setting up new production machinery purchased in the United States, much of it from Ames.

Burton returned briefly to Harpers Ferry in June 1859 to marry Eugenia Harper Mauzy. The wedding took place in the Harpers Ferry Presbyterian Church on Shenandoah Street in the Lower Town. Just four months later, after their return to England, James and Eugenia Burton learned the startling news of John Brown's Raid in a series of emotional letters from Eugenia's parents, George and Mary Mauzy.

== James Burton at the Richmond Armory ==
The sectional divisiveness brought about by John Brown's Raid soon affected the life of James H. Burton. On January 21, 1860, the Virginia assembly passed a bill "For the better defence [sic] of the State." The old Virginia Manufactory of Arms – renamed the Richmond Armory in 1861 – was reactivated after being shut down for 38 years. When J.R. Anderson & Company was awarded a large contract to supply machinery for the reactivated manufactory, the firm engaged Burton to engineer the Richmond Armory contract in November 1860. On December 4, Burton returned to Harpers Ferry to obtain model rifled musket patterns and components for his new employer, returning to Richmond with a large portfolio of drawings. As Burton arrived back in his home state of Virginia, he helped get the Tredegar Iron Works ready for military production. In 1861, he became a Lieutenant Colonel in the Confederate Ordnance Bureau.

In June 1861, Burton was appointed superintendent of the Richmond Armory, where his complete familiarity with the machinery for manufacturing United States firearms proved indispensable to the Confederacy. In fact, much of the machinery at Richmond had been confiscated from the Harpers Ferry Armory by Confederate forces in June 1861 under Burton's own direction.

Burton was commissioned Lieutenant Colonel in the Confederate States Army in December 1861, and placed in charge of all Southern armories. In June 1862, Burton left Richmond for Macon, Georgia, where he established a new armory for the Confederacy. One year later Burton traveled to England to "purchase and contract for the machinery, tools and material required for the new Armory. Acquire British machinery to manufacture arms for the war effort. Burton returned to Macon in October 1863, where he awaited delivery of several shipments of machinery from the firm Greenwood & Batley of Leeds, England. The machinery and tools were finally shipped to Bermuda in late 1864, where they awaited reshipment to run the Union naval blockade. But then the Civil War ended.

Burton was taken prisoner along with the Confederate garrison at Macon in April 1865. He subsequently signed the "Oath of Allegiance to the United States" and on October 4, 1865, was granted a presidential pardon by Andrew Johnson.

== After the Civil War ==
After the war, Burton returned to England to superintend a new armory for Greenwood & Batley. Returning to the United States in 1868, Burton took up residence in Leesburg, Virginia. He returned to Leeds, England in 1871 to engineer a firearms contract for the Russian Government. But ill health intervened, and in 1873 he returned to Virginia for good and took up farming near Winchester, Virginia. Here, James H. Burton died on October 18, 1894, far removed from the weapons technology he had been so instrumental in developing.

== Bibliography ==
- "Colonel James H. Burton Papers" (Manuscript Group #117). Yale University, Sterling Memorial Library, Manuscripts and Archives.
- Edwards, William B, "One-Man Armory: Colonel J.H. Burton." Virginia Cavalcade, Autumn, 1962.
- Gordon, Robert B., "The Burton Drawings at Harpers Ferry." Unpublished manuscript. Smithsonian document JB.mss-200891.
- Lord, Francis A., Civil War Collector's Encyclopedia. Edison, New Jersey: Blue & Grey Press, 1989.
- Smith, Merritt Roe, Harpers Ferry Armory and the New Technology. Ithaca: Cornell University Press, 1977.
