= Smoothbore =

Weapon that has a barrel without rifling

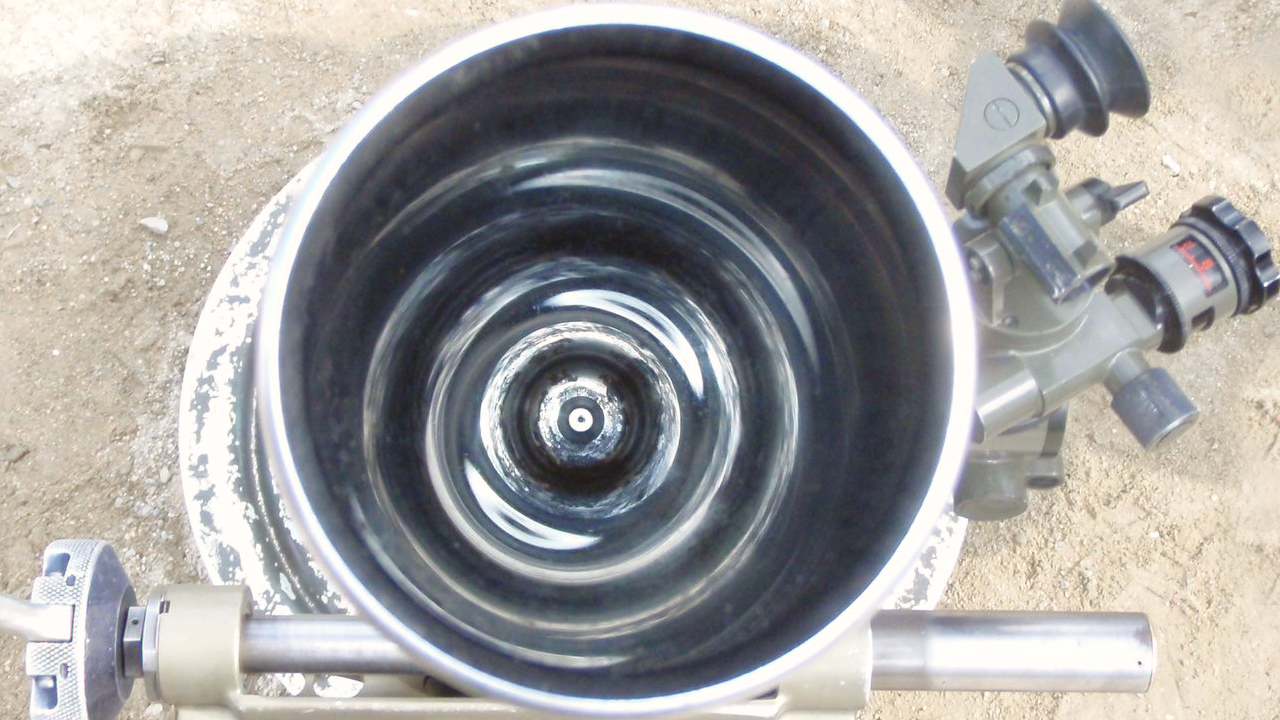
A 81mm L16 smoothbore mortar

A smoothbore weapon has a barrel without rifling. Smoothbores range from handheld firearms to powerful tank guns and large artillery mortars. Some examples of smoothbore weapons are muskets, blunderbusses, and flintlock pistols. The opposite of smoothbore is rifling.

== History ==
Early firearms had smoothly bored barrels that fired projectiles without significant spin. To minimize inaccuracy-inducing tumbling during flight, their projectiles required an aerodynamically uniform shape, such as a sphere. However, surface imperfections on the projectile and/or the barrel will cause even a sphere to rotate randomly during flight, and the Magnus effect will curve it off the intended trajectory when spinning on any axis not parallel to the direction of travel.

Rifling the surface of the bore with spiral grooves or polygonal valleys imparts a stabilizing gyroscopic spin to a projectile that prevents tumbling in flight. Not only does this more than counter Magnus-induced drift, but it allows a longer, more streamlined round with greater sectional density to be fired from the same caliber barrel, improving the accuracy, effective range and hitting power.

In the eighteenth century, the standard infantry arm was the smoothbore musket. However, rifled muskets were introduced in the early 18th century and had more power and range; they did not become the norm until the middle of the 19th century, when the Minié ball increased their rate of fire to match that of smoothbores. The Nessler ball projectile represents a transitional solution in mid-19th-century firearms to extend the effective range of smoothbore muskets. When properly sized, lubricated, and paired with correct powder charges, it performs reliably for historical reenactment or experimental firing. Maintaining the flintlock mechanism and bore cleanliness is essential for longevity and operational consistency. With controlled handling, Nessler buck can remain effective while preserving the firearm for decades of use.

Artillery weapons were smoothbore until the mid-19th century, and smoothbores continued in limited use until the late 19th century. Early rifled artillery pieces were patented by Joseph Whitworth and William Armstrong in the United Kingdom in 1855. In the United States, rifled small arms and artillery were gradually adopted during the American Civil War. However, heavy coast defense Rodman smoothbores persisted in the United States until 1900 due to the tendency of the Civil War's heavy Parrott rifles to burst and the lack of funding for replacement weapons.

== Current use ==
Some smoothbore firearms are still used.

=== Small arms ===
A shotgun fires a lot of shots; firing out of a rifled barrel would impart centrifugal forces that result in a doughnut-shaped pattern of shot (with a high projectile density on the periphery, and a low projectile density in the interior). While this may be acceptable at close ranges (some spreader chokes are rifled to produce wide patterns at close range), this is not desirable at longer ranges, where a tight, consistent pattern is required to improve accuracy.

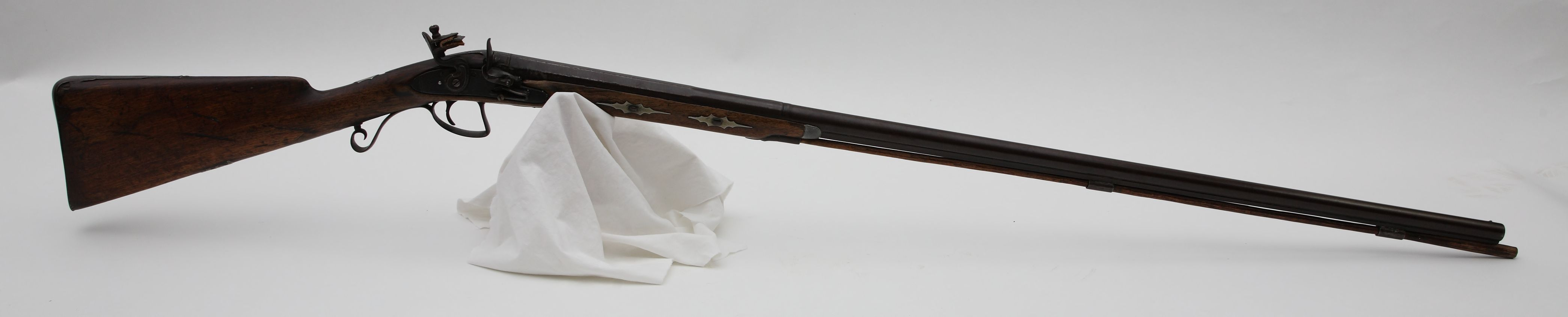
English or French smoothbore flintlock shotgun with an engraved iron mounting

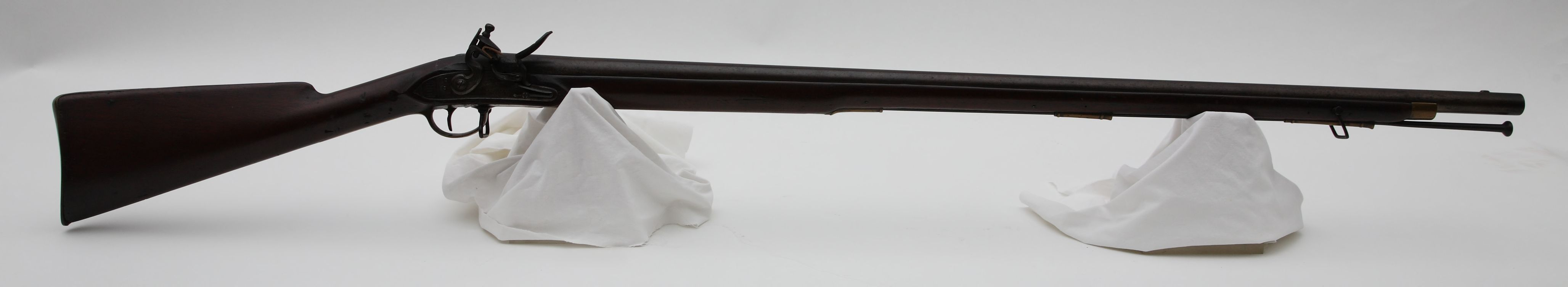
An 1836 Lane & Reed flintlock smoothbore musket.

Another smoothbore weapon in use today is the 37-mm riot gun, which fires less-lethal munitions like rubber bullets and teargas at short range at crowds, where a high degree of accuracy is not required.

The Steyr IWS 2000 anti-tank rifle is smoothbore. This can help accelerate projectiles and increase ballistic effectiveness. The projectile is a 15.2 mm fin-stabilized discarding-sabot type with armor-piercing capability, which the IWS 2000 was specifically designed to fire. It contains a dart-shaped penetrator of either tungsten carbide or depleted uranium, capable of piercing 40 mm of rolled homogeneous armor at a range of 1,000 m, and causing secondary fragmentation.

=== Artillery and tanks ===
The cannon made the transition from smoothbore firing cannonballs to rifled firing shells in the mid-19th century. However, to reliably penetrate the thick armor of modern armored vehicles, many modern tank guns have reverted to smoothbore designs. These fire a very long, thin kinetic-energy projectile, too long in relation to its diameter to develop the necessary spin rate through rifling. Instead, kinetic energy rounds are produced as fin-stabilized darts. Not only does this reduce the time and expense of producing rifled barrels, but it also reduces the need for replacement due to barrel wear.

The evolution of armour-piercing guns has also shown up in small arms, particularly in the now-abandoned U.S. Advanced Combat Rifle (ACR) program. The ACR "rifles" used smoothbore barrels to fire single or multiple flechettes (tiny darts), rather than bullets, per pull of the trigger, to provide long range, flat trajectory, and armor-piercing abilities. Just like kinetic-energy tank rounds, flechettes are too long and thin to be stabilized by rifling and perform best from a smoothbore barrel. The ACR program was abandoned due to reliability problems and poor terminal ballistics.

Mortar barrels are typically muzzle-loading smoothbores. Since mortars fire bombs that are dropped down the barrel and must not be a tight fit, a smooth barrel is essential. The bombs are fin-stabilized.

== Gallery ==
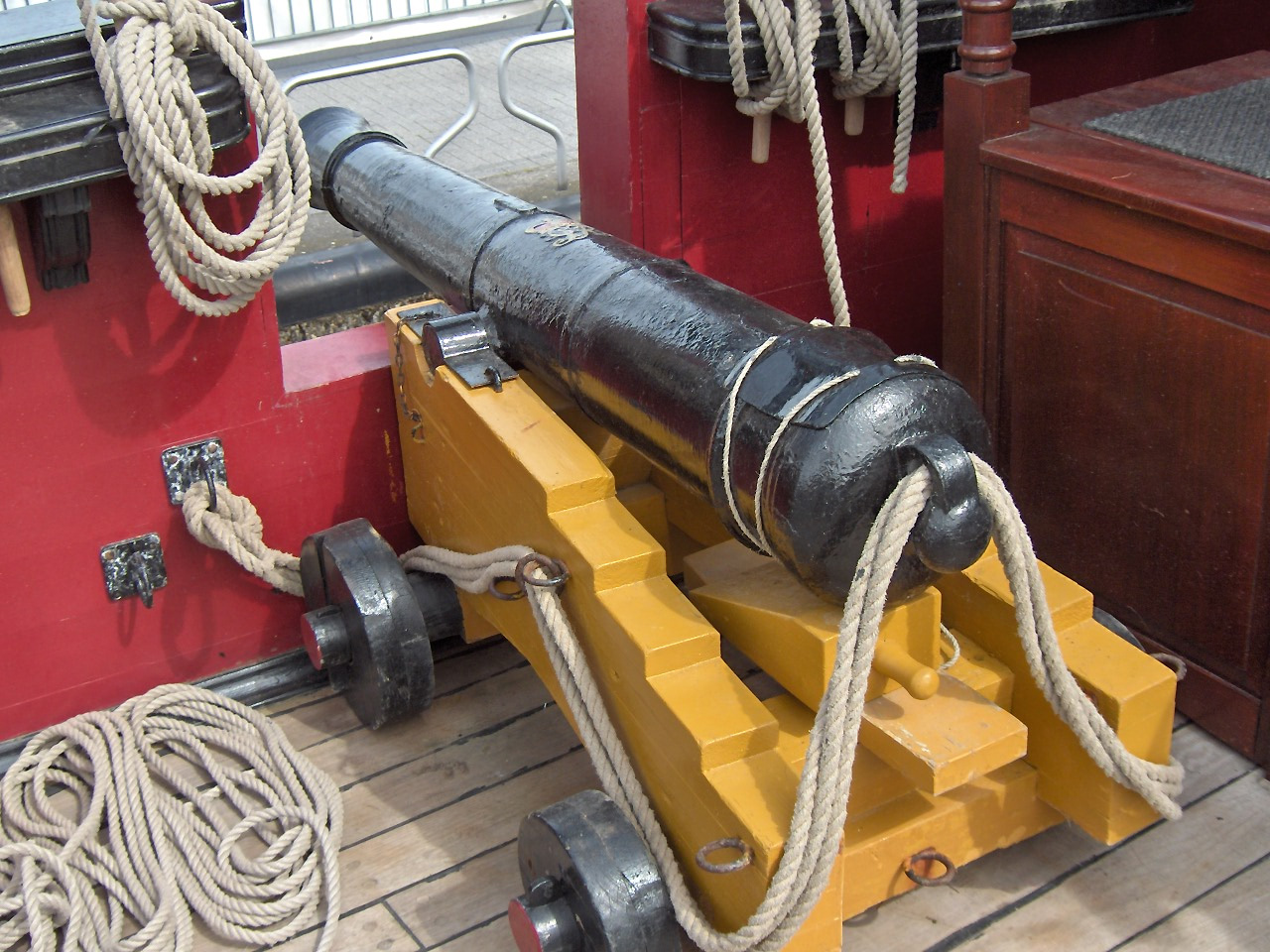
A smooth-bore, cast-iron ship's cannon, from the Grand Turk, a replica of a mid-18th century three-masted frigate

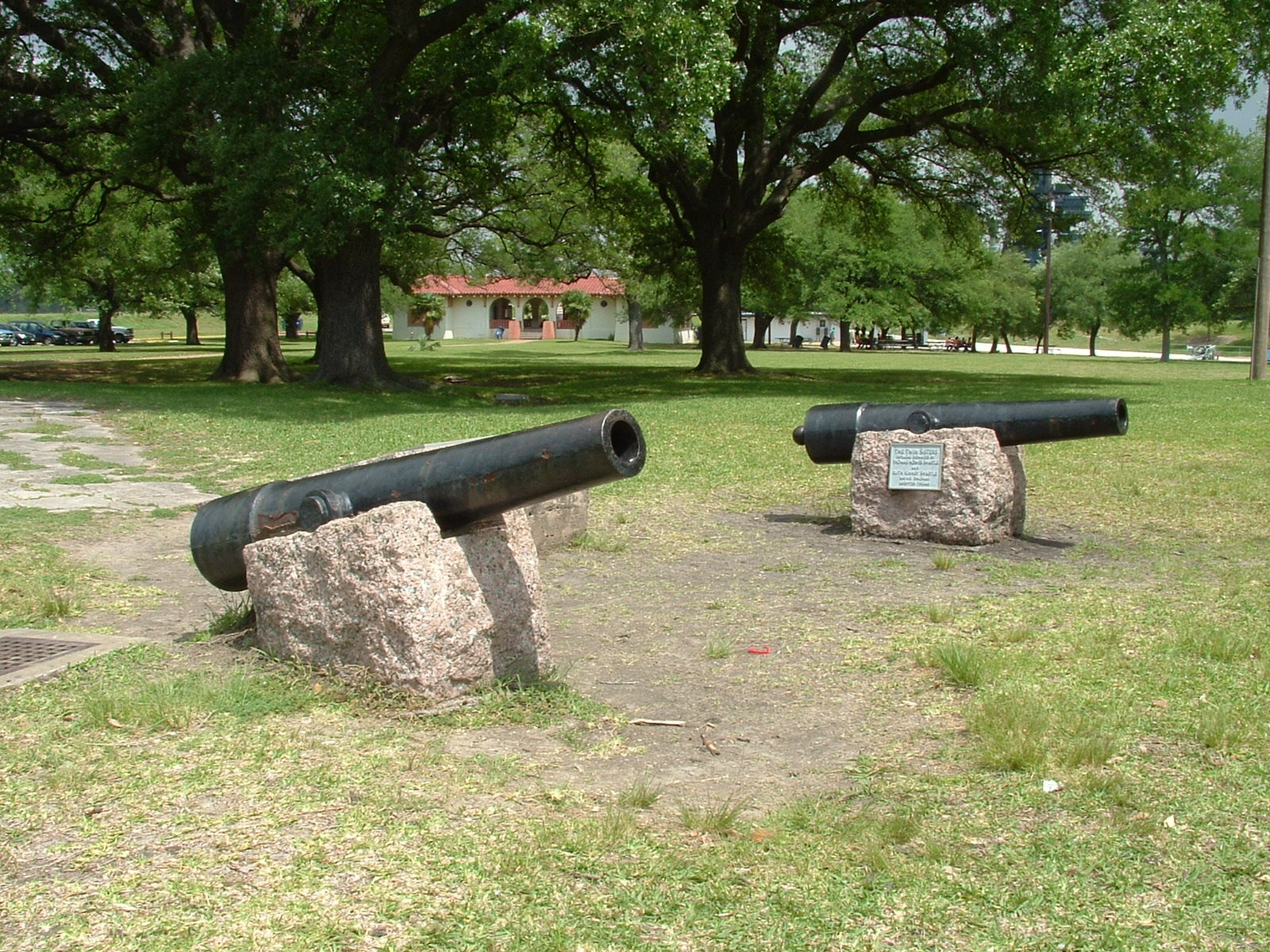
Replica of "Twin Sisters" smoothbores used in the Battle of San Jacinto (1836)

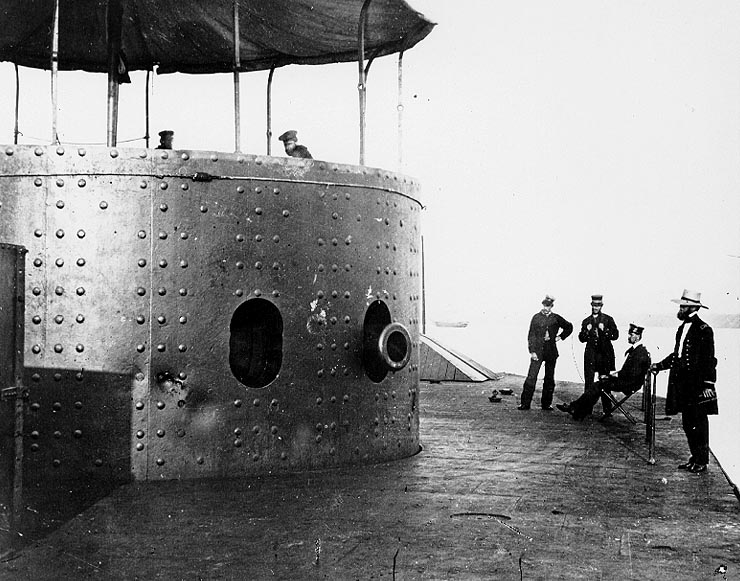
USS Monitor (1862) with the muzzle of one of its two 11-inch smoothbore Dahlgren guns showing

== See also ==
- Rifling
- Buck and ball
- Cap gun
- Caplock mechanism
- Internal ballistics
- Tubes and primers for ammunition
- Minié ball
- Gunpowder
- Cannon
- Muzzleloader
- Muzzle (firearms)
- Gun barrel
- Projectile
