= Minié ball =

Type of conical projectile for mid 19th century rifles

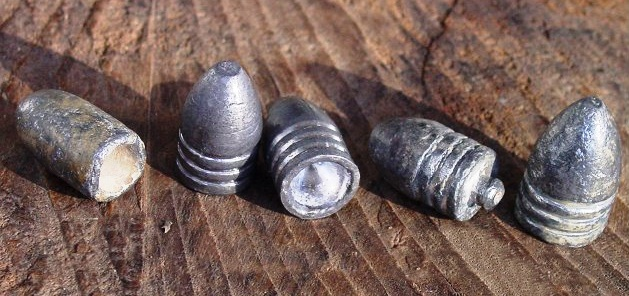
Various types of Minié balls. The four on the right are provided with Tamisier ball grooves for holding grease. One of them is a cleaner bullet.

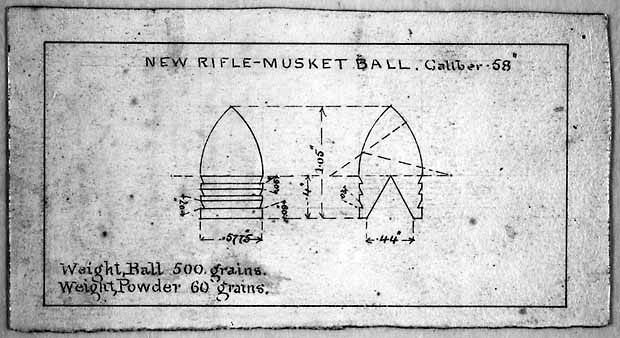
James H. Burton's 1855 Minié ball design (.58 caliber, 500 grains) from the Harpers Ferry Armory

The Minié ball, or Minie ball, is a type of hollow-based bullet designed by Claude-Étienne Minié for muzzle-loaded, rifled muskets. Invented in 1849 shortly followed by the Minié rifle, the Minié ball came to prominence during the Crimean War and the American Civil War where it was found to inflict significantly more serious wounds than earlier round musket balls. Both the American Springfield Model 1861 and the British Pattern 1853 Enfield rifled muskets, the most common weapons found during the American Civil War, used the Minié ball.

Rifling, the addition of spiral grooves inside a gun barrel, imparts a stabilizing spin to a projectile for better external ballistics, greatly increasing the effective range and accuracy of the gun. Before the introduction of the Minié ball, which themselves needed greasing, balls had to be rammed down the barrel, sometimes with a mallet, because gunpowder residue would foul a rifled bore after a relatively small number of shots, requiring frequent cleaning of the gun. The development of the Minié ball was significant because it was the first projectile type that could be made with a loose enough fit to easily slide down the barrel of a rifled long gun, yet maintain good accuracy during firing due to obturation by expansion of the bullet's base when fired.

== Designs ==
The Minié ball is a cylindro-conoidal bullet with grease-filled cannelures on its exterior and a cone-shaped hollow in its base. Minié designed the bullet with a small iron plug, and lead skirting that would expand under the pressure of gunpowder deflagration causing the bullet to obturate, and grip the rifling grooves. This maximized muzzle velocity by creating a good bullet-to-bore seal with minimal pressure loss.

A precursor to the Minié ball was created in the 1830s by French Army captains Montgomery and Henri-Gustave Delvigne. Their design was made to allow rapid muzzle loading of rifles, an innovation that brought about the widespread use of the rifle rather than the smoothbore musket as a mass battlefield weapon. Delvigne had invented a ball that could expand upon ramming to fit the grooves of a rifle in 1826. The cylindro-conoidal ball design had been proposed in 1832 by Captain John Norton, but had not been adopted.

Captain James H. Burton, an armorer at the Harpers Ferry Armory, developed a major improvement on Minié's design when he added a deep conical cavity at the base of the ball, which more efficiently filled up with gas and expanded the bullet's skirt upon firing. A higher percentage of the explosive force went toward forward projectile motion and lesser percentage toward fitting into the rifling. Burton's modified Minie ball had decreased mass and increased speed, resulting in increased energy and better range, as well as a cheaper bullet, which was used in the Crimean War, and then the American Civil War. Burton's version of the ball weighed 1.14 ounces.

The Wilkinson bullet is a compression-style projectile designed by Henry Wilkinson in the late 1840s, intended to expand into rifle grooves upon firing rather than relying on gas expansion or soft lead flow. Although Wilkinson submitted his design to British trials for the 1853 Enfield rifle, it was rejected due to flaws such as nipping cartridge paper; however, a similar compression design by Josef Ritter von Lorenz was adopted by the Austro-Hungarian army. After passing trials, Great Britain eventually adopted own original caliber Pritchett ball mainly for the Enfield rifle.

The Imperal Russian military in 19th century, however, faced significant deficiencies in armament. While they had initiated the transition to rifled musket, their standard-issue firearm remained the M1845 percussion musket and other units issued Lüttich-made copies of the Brunswick rifle that could fire new-issue conical bullets with two opposing studs instead of the round girdled bullet, complemented by pre-1856 rifled muskets that utilized bullets derived from the Minié design. The Russian variant was known as "Peter's Ball" and alternatively as the "Timmerhans Ball," likely named after key figures involved in its development or introduction into Russian service.

== Use ==
The Minié ball could be quickly removed from the paper cartridge, with the gunpowder poured down the barrel and the unexpanded bullet pushed down after it passed the muzzle rifling and any carbon build up from prior shots. It was then rammed with the ramrod, which packed the charge and filled the hollow base with powder. When the rifle was fired, the exploding gas in the base of the bullet expanded the skirt to engage the rifling, providing spin for accuracy and a better seal for consistent velocity and longer range.

== Effects ==
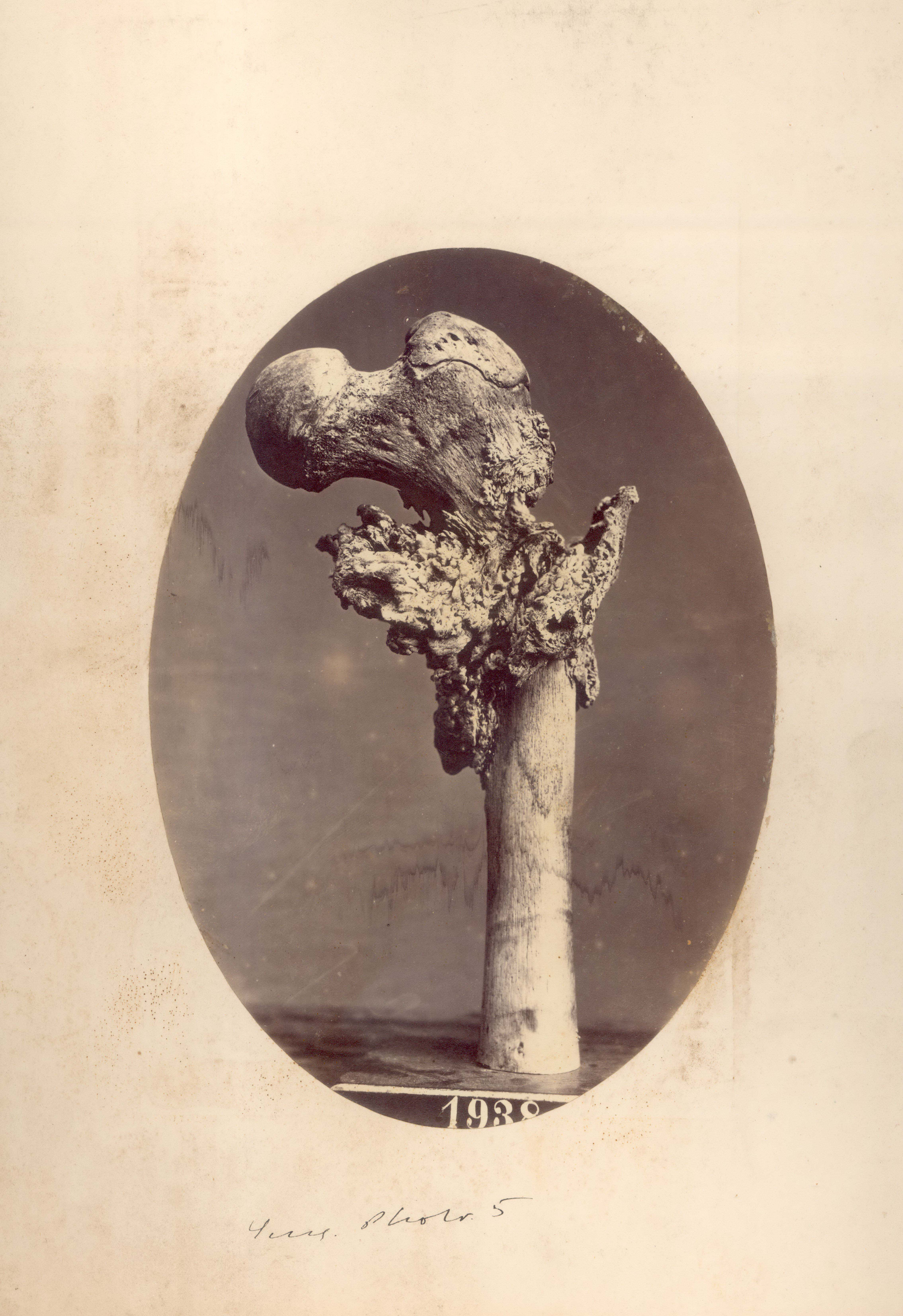
Gunshot fracture of the left femur by a Minié ball, 1863

Wounds inflicted by the conical Minié ball were different from those caused by the round balls from smoothbore muskets, since the conical ball had a higher muzzle velocity and greater mass, and easily penetrated the human body. Round balls tended to remain lodged in the flesh, and they were often observed to take a winding path through the body. Flexed muscles and tendons, as well as bone, could cause the round ball to deviate from a straight path. The Minié ball tended to cut a straight path and usually went all the way through the injured part; the ball seldom remained lodged in the body. If a Minié ball struck a bone, it usually shattered it. The damage to bones and resulting compound fractures were usually severe enough to necessitate amputation. A hit on a major blood vessel could also have serious and often lethal consequences.

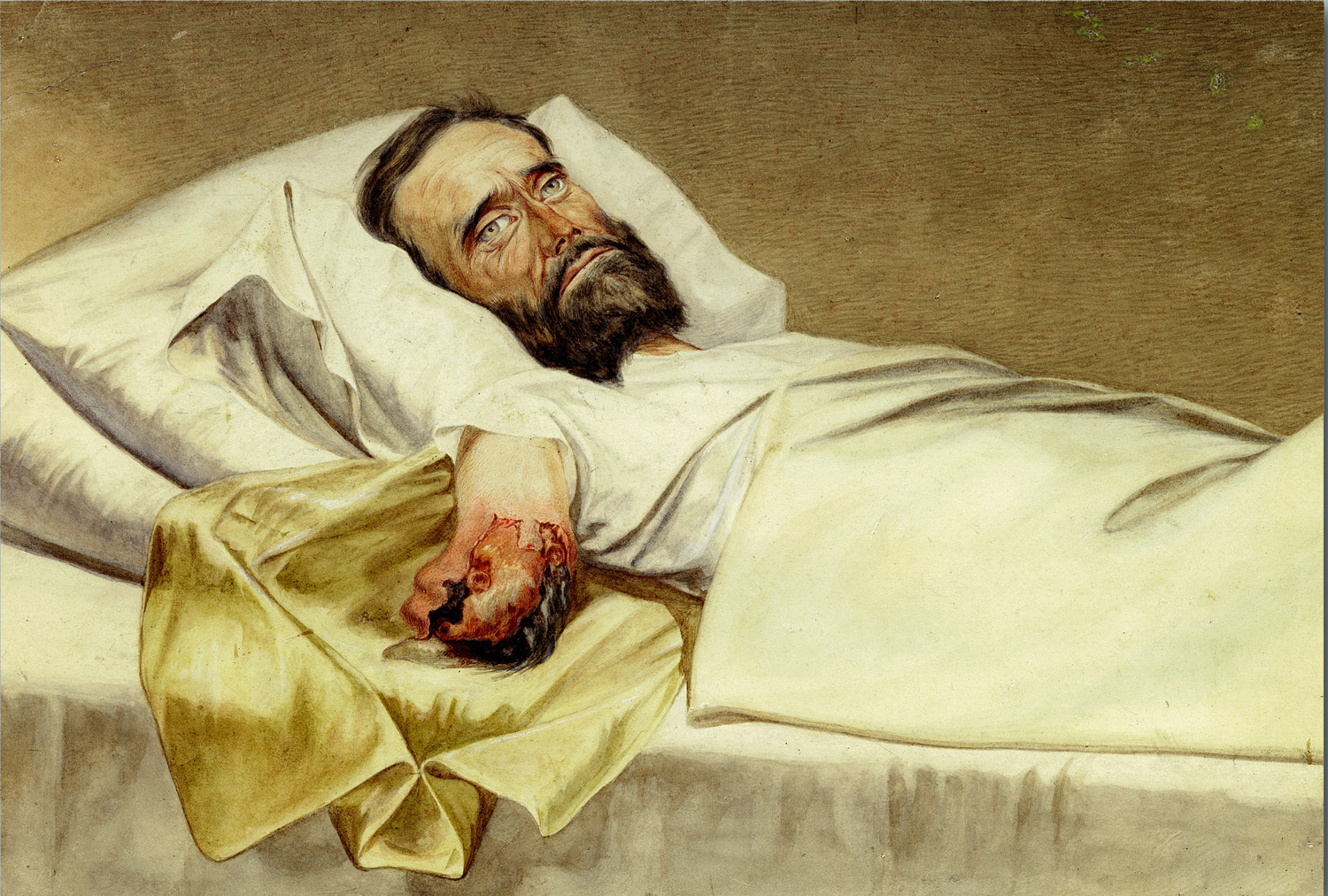
Private Milton E. Wallen of Company C, 1st Kentucky Cavalry, wounded by a Minié ball, while in prison at Richmond, July 4, 1863, being treated for gangrene

One of the more infamous documented cases involving Minié ball injuries concerned a Confederate soldier wounded during Jubal Early's raid on Washington, D.C. on July 12, 1864. The soldier, a private in the 53rd North Carolina Infantry, was hit in the side of the head by a .58 caliber Minié ball, which shattered his skull and lodged in the right hemisphere of the brain. He went into convulsions and became paralyzed on one side of his body, but started recovering within eight days of being hospitalized. However, within three more days, his condition deteriorated and he eventually lost consciousness and died, having survived with his wound for 16 days. An autopsy of the soldier found that the right hemisphere of the brain was extensively damaged and large areas of it had necrosed. The primary cause of death had been infection caused by both the initial injury and subsequent necrosis of brain tissue.

== See also ==
- Cap gun
- Caplock mechanism
- Gunpowder
- Internal ballistics
- Muzzleloader
- Nessler ball
- Pritchett bullet
- Tubes and primers for ammunition
- Rocket ball
- Dumdum bullet
