= Rifle =

Common long range firearm

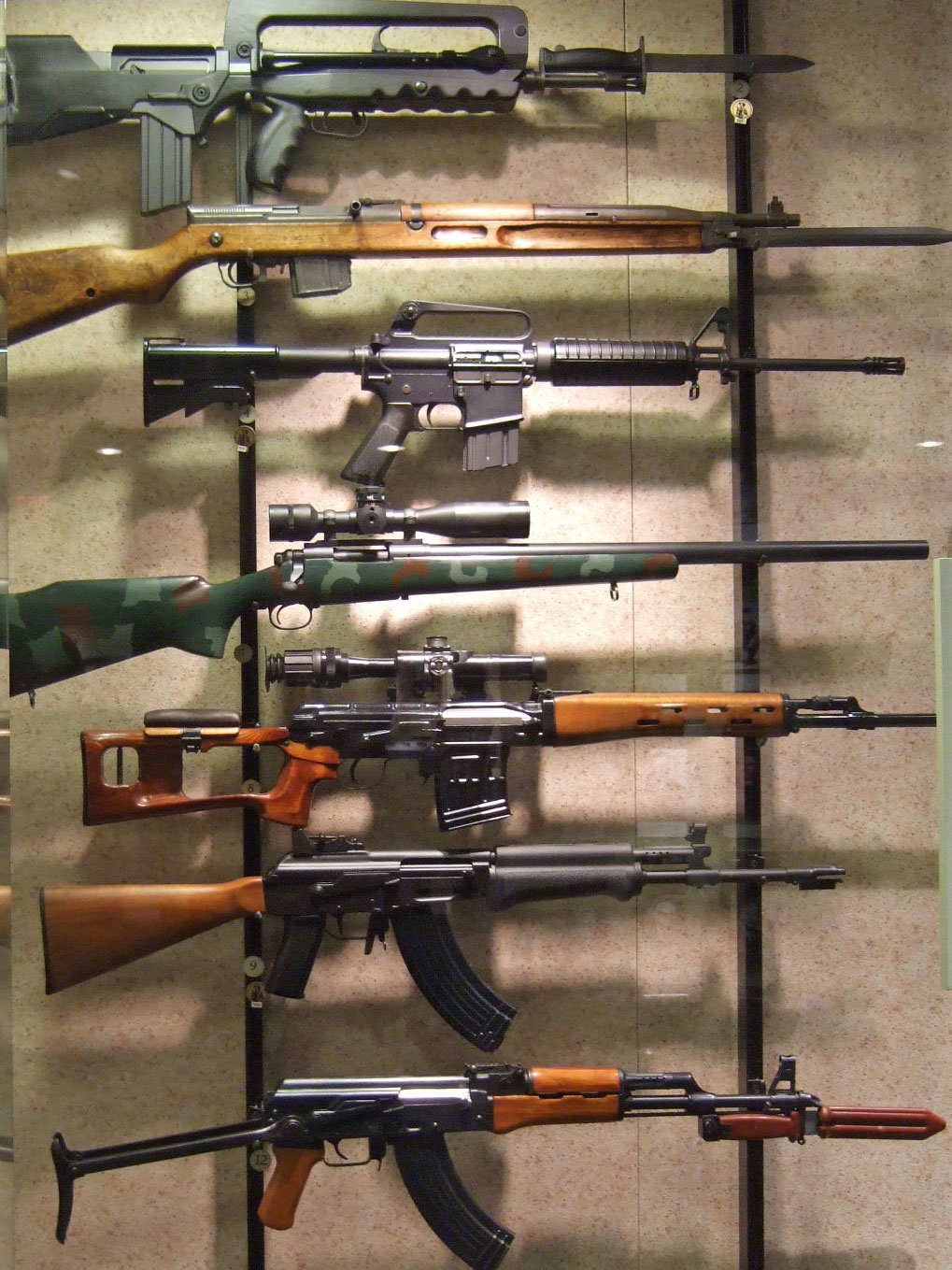
Common military rifles from the mid-to-late 20th century of various types and configurations, displayed at the National Firearms Museum in Virginia, United States. Top to bottom: FAMAS, vz. 52 rifle, CAR-15, M40, SVD rifle, RK 62, and AKMS.

A rifle is a long-barreled firearm designed for accurate shooting, distinguished by having a barrel cut with a helical or spiralling pattern of grooves (rifling). Most rifles are designed to be held with both hands and braced against the shoulder via a buttstock for stability. Rifles are used in warfare, law enforcement, hunting and target shooting sports.

The invention of rifling separated such firearms from the earlier smoothbore weapons (e.g., arquebuses, muskets, and other long guns), greatly elevating their accuracy and general effectiveness. The raised areas of a barrel's rifling are called lands; they make contact with and exert torque on the projectile as it moves down the bore, imparting a spin. When the projectile leaves the barrel, this spin persists and lends gyroscopic stability to the projectile due to conservation of angular momentum, increasing accuracy and hence effective range. The class of firearm was originally termed the rifled gun, with the verb to rifle referring to the early modern machining process of creating grooves with cutting tools.

Like all typical firearms, a rifle's projectile (bullet) is propelled by the contained deflagration of a combustible propellant compound (originally black powder and now nitrocellulose and other smokeless powders), although other propulsive means are used, such as compressed air in air rifles, which are popular for vermin control, small game hunting, competitive target shooting and casual sport shooting (plinking).

== Terminology ==
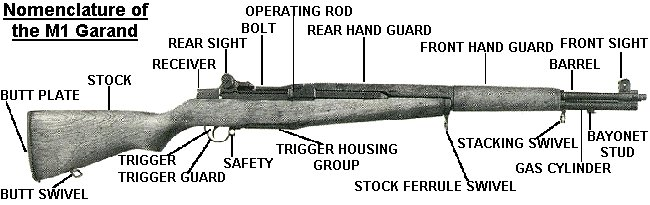
Names of parts of the M1 Garand rifle, World War II era, from US Army field manual

Historically, rifles only fired a single projectile with each squeeze of the trigger. Modern rifles are commonly classified as single-shot, bolt-action, semi-automatic, or automatic. Single-shot, bolt-action, and semi-automatic rifles are limited by their designs to fire a single shot for each trigger pull. Only automatic rifles are capable of firing more than one round per trigger squeeze; however, some automatic rifles are limited to fixed bursts of two, three, or more rounds per squeeze.

Modern automatic rifles overlap to some extent in design and function with machine guns. In fact, many light machine guns are adaptations of existing automatic rifle designs, such as the RPK and M27 Infantry Automatic Rifle. A military's light machine guns are typically chambered for the same caliber ammunition as its service rifles. Generally, the difference between an automatic rifle and a machine gun comes down to weight, cooling system, and ammunition feed system. Rifles, with their relatively lighter components (which overheat quickly) and smaller capacity magazines, are incapable of sustained automatic fire in the way that machine guns are; they trade this capability in favor of increased mobility. Modern military rifles are fed by magazines, while machine guns are generally belt-fed. Many machine guns allow the operator to quickly exchange barrels in order to prevent overheating, whereas rifles generally do not. Most machine guns fire from an open bolt in order to reduce the danger of "cook-off", while almost all rifles fire from a closed bolt for accuracy. Machine guns are often crewed by more than one soldier; the rifle is an individual weapon.

The term "rifle" is sometimes used to describe larger rifled crew-served weapons firing explosive shells, for example, recoilless rifles and naval rifles.

== Historical overview ==
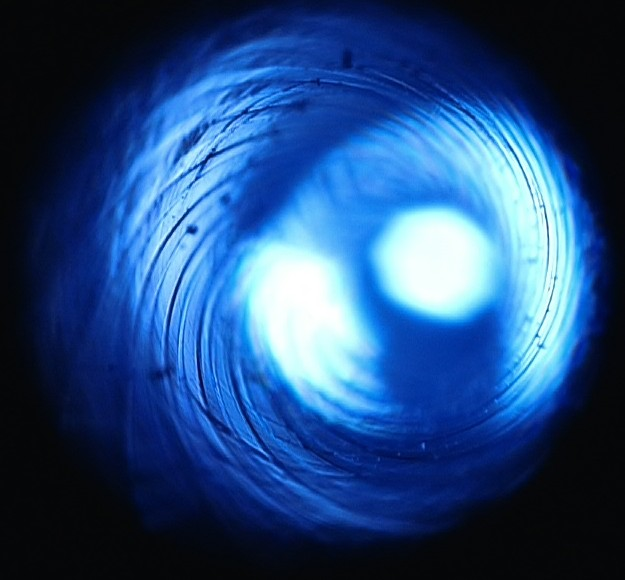
Rifling in a .35 Remington microgroove rifled barrel

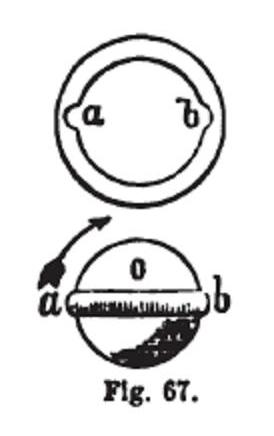
Girdled bullet and twin rifle groove of the Brunswick rifle, mid-19th century

The origins of rifling are difficult to trace, but some of the earliest European experiments seem to have been carried out during the 15th century. Archers had long realized that a twist added to the tail feathers of their arrows gave them greater accuracy. Early muskets produced large quantities of smoke and soot, which had to be cleaned from the action and bore of the musket frequently, either through the action of repeated bore scrubbing, or a deliberate attempt to create "soot grooves" that would allow for more shots to be fired from the firearm.

Some of the earliest examples of European grooved gun barrels were reportedly manufactured during 1440, and further developed by Gaspard Kollner of Vienna c. 1498, although other scholars allege they were a joint effort between Kollner and Augustus Kotter of Nuremberg c. 1520.

Rifles were created as an improvement in the accuracy of smoothbore muskets. In the early 18th century, Benjamin Robins, an English mathematician, realized that an elongated bullet would retain the momentum and kinetic energy of a musket ball, but would slice through the air with greater ease. The black powder used in early muzzle-loading rifles quickly fouled the barrel, making loading slower and more difficult. The greater range of the rifle was considered to be of little practical use since the smoke from black powder quickly obscured the battlefield and made it almost impossible to aim the weapon from a distance. Since musketeers could not afford to take the time to stop and clean their barrels in the middle of a battle, rifles were limited to use by sharpshooters and non-military uses like hunting.

Muskets were smoothbore, large caliber weapons using spherical ammunition fired at relatively low velocity. Due to the high cost and great difficulty of precision manufacturing, and the need to load readily from the muzzle, the musket ball was a loose fit in the barrel. Consequently, on firing the ball bounced off the sides of the barrel when fired and the final direction on leaving the muzzle was unpredictable.

In the Province of Pennsylvania, British America, one of the most successful early rifles, the long rifle, was developed over the course of the 18th century. Compared to the more common Brown Bess, these Pennsylvania and Kentucky rifles had a tighter bore with no space between bullet and barrel, and still used balls instead of conical bullets. The balls the long rifle used were smaller, allowing the production of more rounds for a given amount of lead. These rifles also had longer barrels, allowing more accuracy, which were rifled with a helical groove. These first started appearing sometime before 1740, one early example being made by Jacob Dickert, a German immigrant. By 1750 there were a number of such manufacturers in the area. The longer barrel was a departure by local gunsmiths from their German roots, allowing bullets to achieve a higher speed (as the burning gunpowder was contained longer) before emerging from the barrel.

During the 1700s (18th century), colonial settlers, particularly those immigrating from Germany and Switzerland, adapted and improved upon their European rifles. The improved long rifles were used for precise shooting, aiming, and firing at individual targets, instead of the musket's use for imprecise fire. During the American Revolution, the colonist troops favoured these more accurate rifles while their use was resisted by the British and Hessian troops.

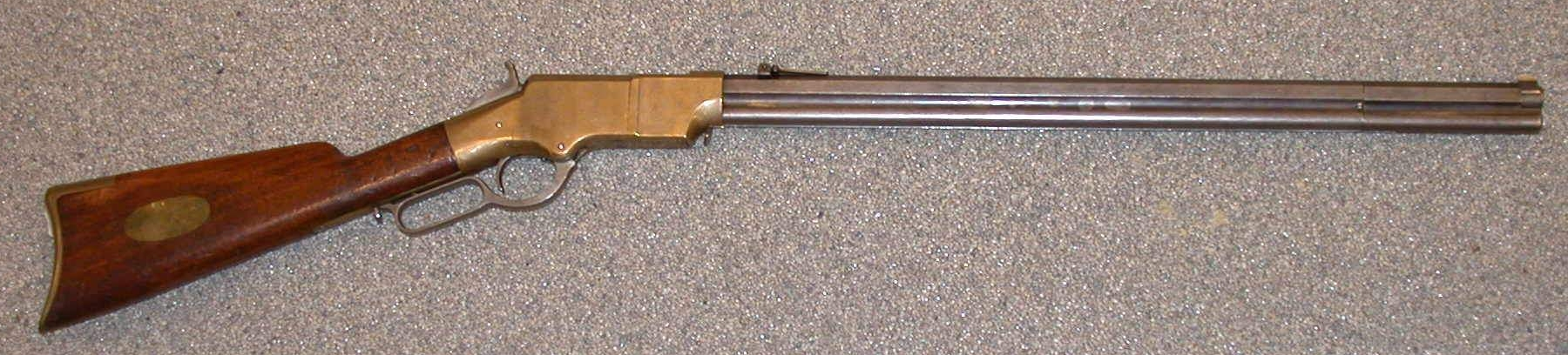
A Henry rifle, the first successful lever action repeating rifle

By the time of the American Revolutionary War, these rifles were commonly used by frontiersmen, and Congress authorized the establishment of ten companies of riflemen. One of the most critical units was Morgan's Riflemen, led by Daniel Morgan. This sharpshooting unit eventually proved itself integral to the Battle of Saratoga, and in the southern states where General Morgan commanded as well. Taking advantage of the rifle's improved accuracy, Morgan's sharpshooters picked off cannoneers and officers, reducing the impact of enemy artillery. This kind of advantage was considered pivotal in many battles, such as the battles of Cowpens, Saratoga, and King's Mountain.

Later during the Napoleonic Wars, the British 95th Regiment (Green Jackets) and 60th Regiment, (Royal American), as well as sharpshooters and riflemen during the War of 1812, used the rifle to great effect during skirmishing. Because of a slower loading time than a musket, they were not adopted by the whole army. Since rifles were used by sharpshooters who did not routinely fire over other men's shoulders, long length was not required to avoid the forward line. A shorter length made a handier weapon in which tight-fitting balls did not have to be rammed so far down the barrel.

The invention of the Minié ball in the 1840s solved the slow loading problem, and in the 1850s and 1860s rifles quickly replaced muskets on the battlefield. Many rifles, often referred to as rifled muskets, were very similar to the muskets they replaced, but the military also experimented with other designs. Breech-loading weapons proved to have a much faster rate of fire than muzzleloaders, causing military forces to abandon muzzle loaders in favor of breech-loading designs in the late 1860s. In the later part of the 19th century, rifles were generally single-shot, breech-loading guns, designed for aimed, discretionary fire by individual soldiers. Then, as now, rifles had a stock, either fixed or folding, to be braced against the shoulder when firing.

The adoption of cartridges and breech-loading in the 19th century was concurrent with the general adoption of rifles. In the early part of the 20th century, soldiers were trained to shoot accurately over long ranges with high-powered cartridges. World War I Lee–Enfield rifles (among others) were equipped with long-range 'volley sights' for massed firing at ranges of up to 1.6 km (1 mi). Individual shots were unlikely to hit, but a platoon firing repeatedly could produce a 'beaten ground' effect similar to light artillery or machine guns.

Currently, rifles are the most common firearm in general use for hunting (with the exception of bird hunting, where shotguns are favored). Rifles derived from military designs have long been popular with civilian shooters.

== 19th century ==
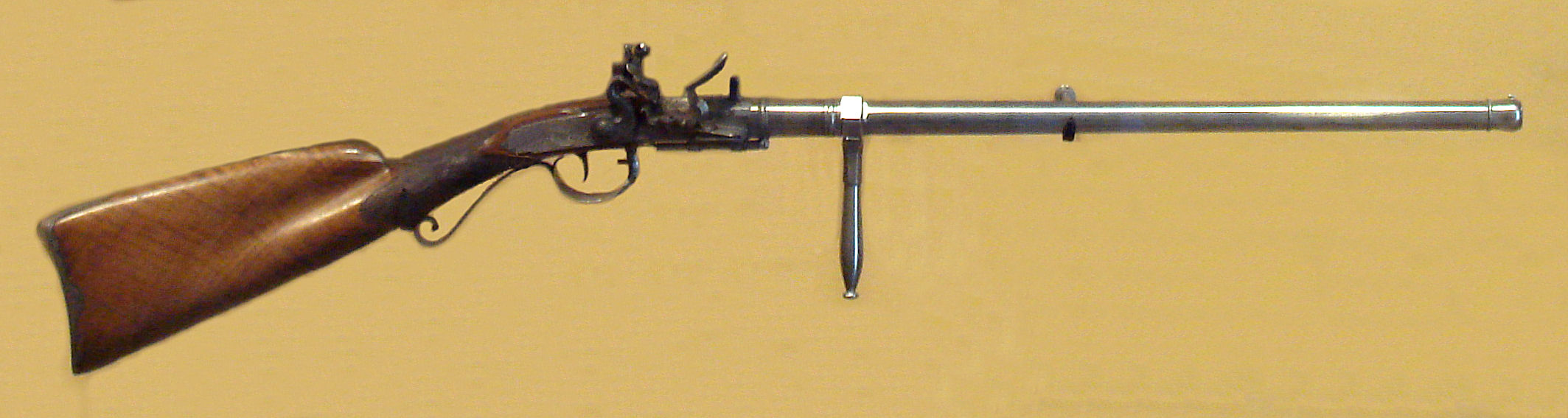
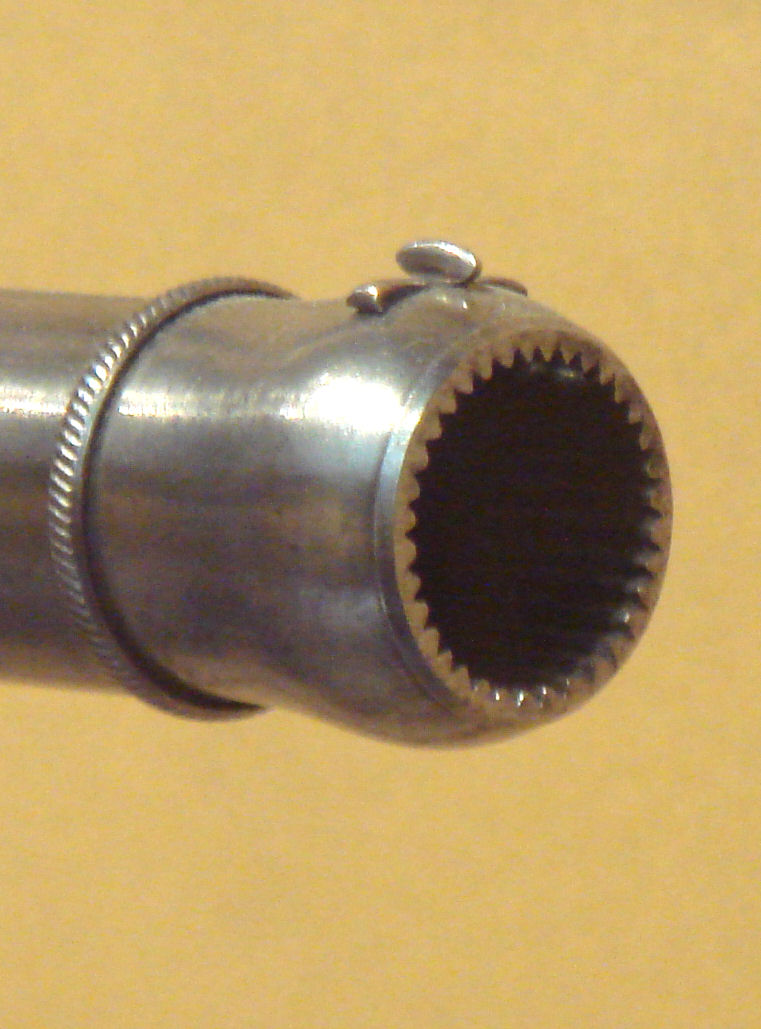
(left) "Premier Consul" model flintlock carbine made by Jean Lepage and named for the First Consul Napoléon Bonaparte, c. 1800; (right) rifling of the Lepage carbine.

In Central Asia, Uzbeks, Kazakhs, and Tajiks in the course of the 19th century adopted a form of large-calibre rifle: the karamultuk or karamultyk.

=== Muzzle-loading ===
Gradually, rifles appeared with cylindrical barrels cut with helical grooves, the surfaces between the grooves being "lands". The innovation was shortly followed by the mass adoption of breech-loading weapons, as it was not practical to push an overbore bullet down through a rifled barrel. The dirt and grime from prior shots were pushed down ahead of a tight bullet or ball (which may have been a looser fit in the clean barrel before the first shot), and loading was far more difficult, as the lead had to be deformed to go down in the first place, reducing the accuracy due to deformation. Several systems were tried to deal with the problem, usually by resorting to an under-bore bullet that expanded upon firing.

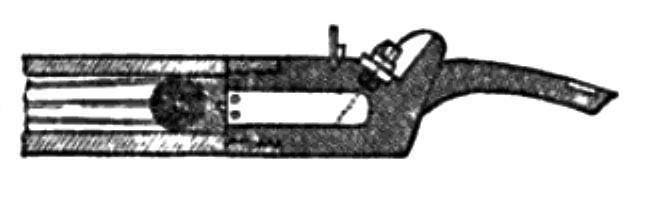
The method developed by Delvigne for his rifles, with the lead bullet being supported by a wooden sabot at its base.

The original muzzle-loading rifle, with a closely fitting ball to take the rifling grooves, was loaded with difficulty, particularly when foul, and for this reason was not generally used for military purposes. With the advent of rifling, the bullet itself did not initially change but was wrapped in a greased, cloth patch to grip the rifling grooves.

The first half of the 19th century saw a distinct change in the shape and function of the bullet. In 1826 Henri-Gustave Delvigne, a French infantry officer, invented a breech with abrupt shoulders on which a spherical bullet was rammed down until it caught the rifling grooves. Delvigne's method, however, deformed the bullet and was inaccurate.

Soon after, Louis-Etienne de Thouvenin invented the Carabine à tige, which had a stem at the bottom of the barrel that would deform and expand the base of the bullet when rammed, therefore enabling accurate contact with the rifling. However, the area around the stem clogged and got dirty easily.

==== Minié system – the "rifled musket" ====
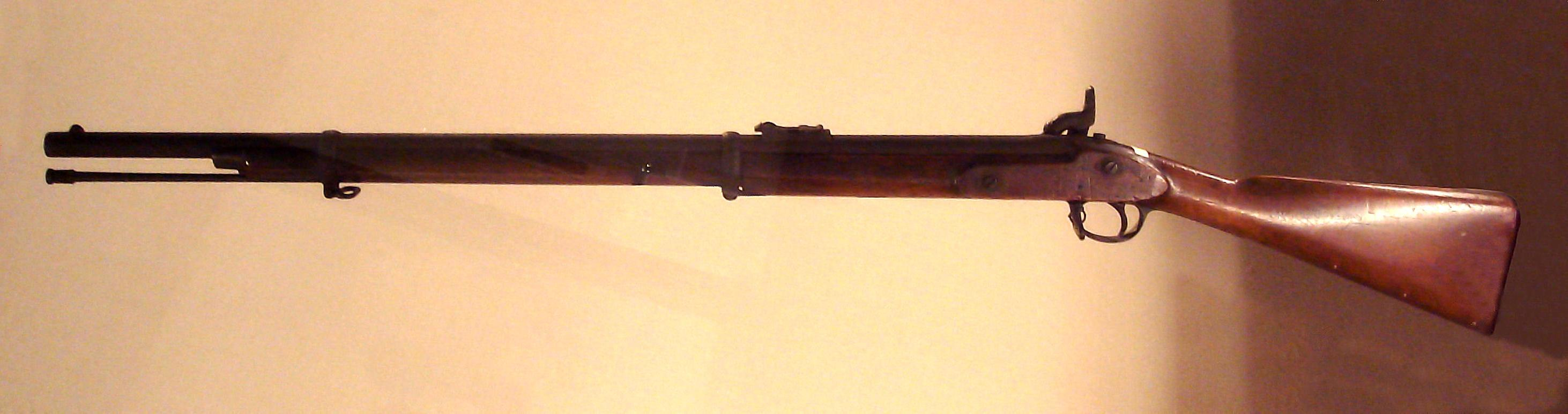
British-made Minié rifle used in Japan during the Boshin war (1868–1869).

The famous Minié system, invented by French Army Captain Claude-Étienne Minié, relied on a conical bullet (known as a Minié ball) with a hollow skirt at the base of the bullet. When fired, the skirt would expand from the pressure of the exploding charge and grip the rifling as the round was fired. The better seal gave more power, as less gas escaped past the bullet. Also, for the same bore (caliber) diameter a long bullet was heavier than a round ball. The extra grip also spun the bullet more consistently, which increased the range from about 50 yards for a smoothbore musket to about 300 yards for a rifle using the Minié system. The expanding skirt of the Minié ball also solved the problem that earlier tight-fitting bullets were difficult to load as black powder residue fouled the inside of the barrel. The Minié system allowed conical bullets to be loaded into rifles just as quickly as round balls in smooth bores, which allowed rifle muskets to replace muskets on the battlefield.

Minié system rifles, notably the U.S. Springfield and the British Enfield of the early 1860s featured prominently in the U.S. Civil War of 1861–1865, due to their enhanced power and accuracy. At the time of the Crimean War (1853–1856) the Minié rifle was considered the "best in military use".

Over the 19th century, bullet design continued to evolve, the bullets becoming gradually smaller and lighter. By 1910 the standard blunt-nosed bullet had been replaced by the pointed, 'spitzer' bullet, an innovation that increased range and penetration. Cartridge design evolved from simple paper tubes containing black powder and shot, to sealed brass cases with integral primers for ignition, and black powder was replaced by cordite, and then by other nitro-cellulose-based smokeless powder mixtures, propelling bullets to higher velocities than before.

The increased velocity meant that new problems arose, and so bullets went from using soft lead to harder lead, then to copper-jacketed, in order to better engage the spiral grooves without "stripping" them in the same way that a screw or bolt thread would be stripped if subjected to extreme forces.

=== Breech loading ===
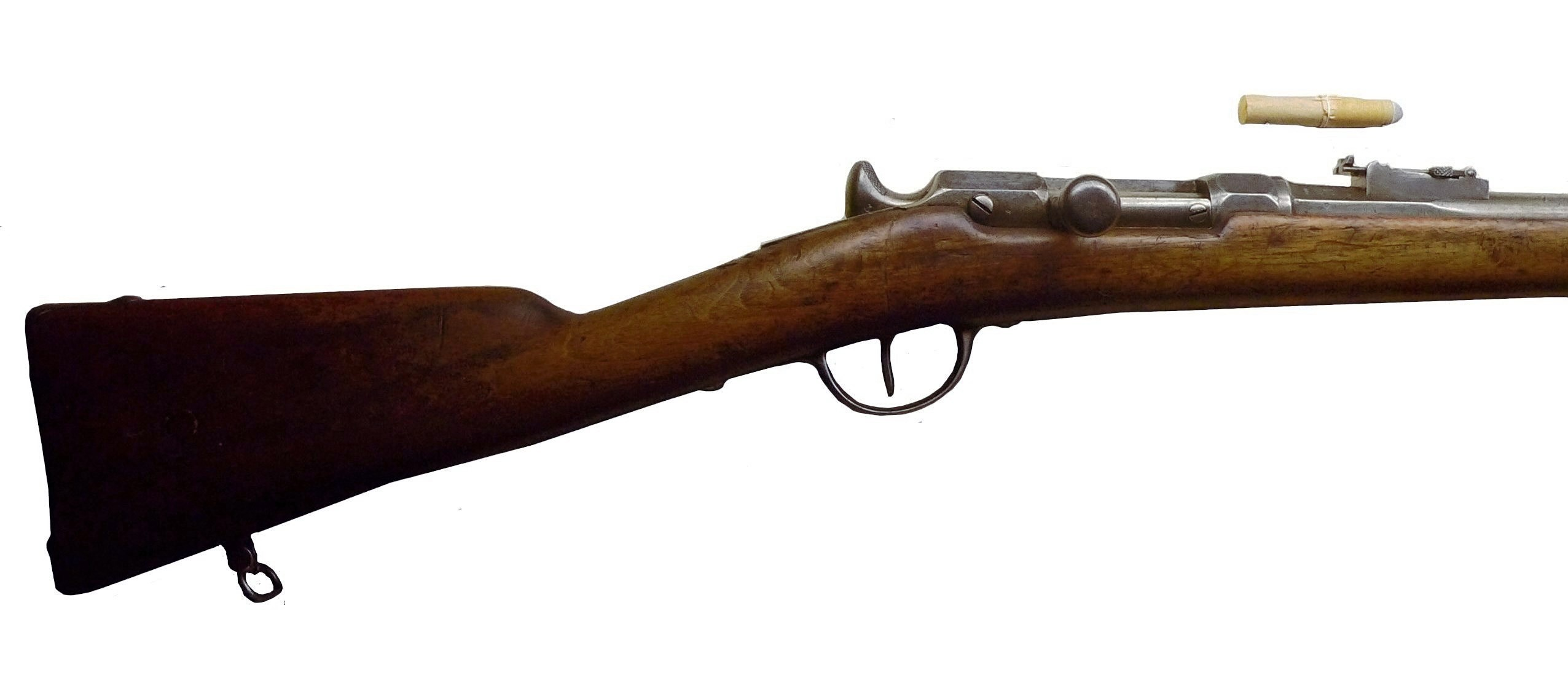
Loading mechanism of the Chassepot

From 1836, breech-loading rifles were introduced with the German Dreyse Needle gun, followed by the French Tabatière in 1857, by the British Calisher and Terry carbine made in Birmingham and later in 1864 by the better known British Snider–Enfield. Primitive chamber-locking mechanisms were soon replaced by bolt-action mechanisms, exemplified by the French Chassepot in 1866. Breech-loading was to have a major impact on warfare, as breech-loading rifles can be fired at a rate many times faster than muzzle-loaded rifles and - significantly - can be loaded from a prone rather than standing position. Firing prone (i.e., lying down) is more accurate than firing from a standing position, and a prone rifleman presents a much smaller target than a standing soldier. The higher accuracy and range, combined with reduced vulnerability generally benefited defense, while making the traditional battle between lines of standing and volleying infantrymen obsolete.

=== Repeating rifle ===
The mid-century drive for increased rates of fire led to the development of the first repeating rifles, a type of breechloader that can load multiple cartridges ahead of time to be stored on the weapon itself. This allowed for a continuous burst of fire during which the user could mechanically cycle in unused rounds without stopping to reload. Various enduring mechanisms would be invented, including bolt action, pump action, lever action, and revolving.

==== Magazine-fed rifle ====
Bolt, lever, and pump actions all allowed for the incorporation of a magazine to store pre-loaded shells. The Spencer repeating rifle was a breech-loading, manually operated lever-action rifle that was adopted by the United States. Over 20,000 were used during the American Civil War. It was the first adoption of a removable-magazine-fed infantry rifle. The design was completed by Christopher Spencer in 1860. It used copper rimfire cartridges stored in a removable seven-round tube magazine, enabling the rounds to be fired one after another. A rifleman could exchange an emptied magazine for another. The Winchester repeating rifle was invented in 1866 as a lever action.

==== Revolving rifle ====
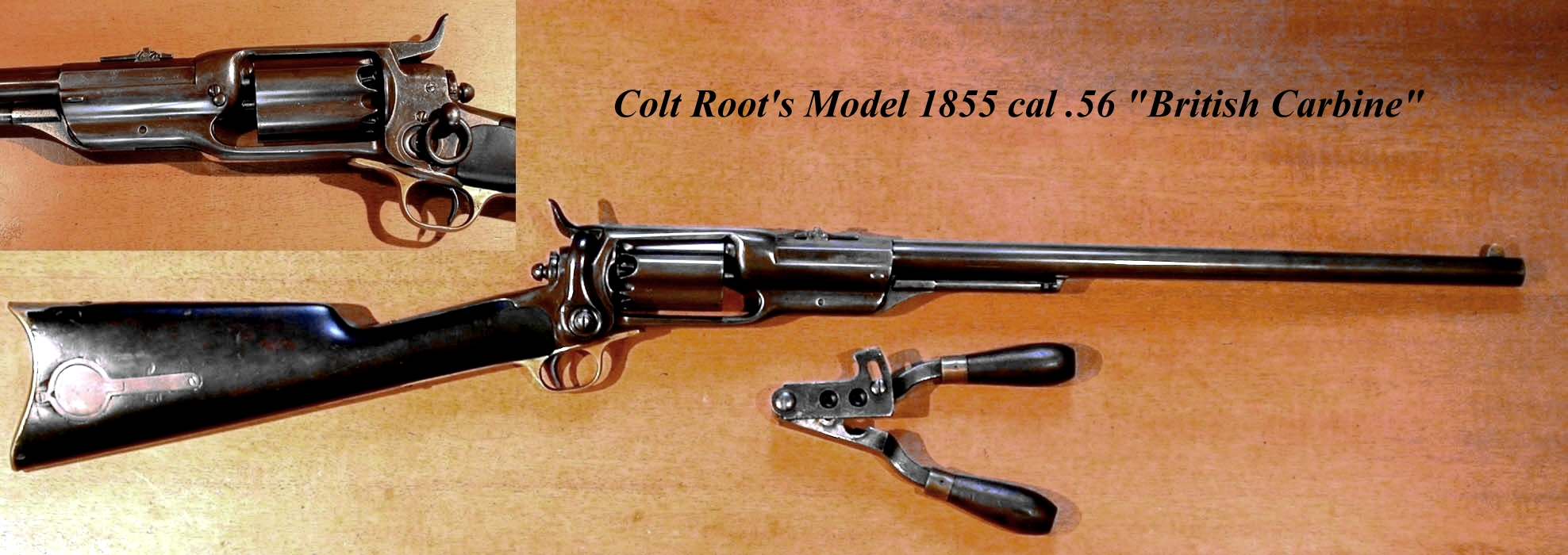
Colt Model 1855 Carbine

Revolving rifles were an attempt to increase the rate of fire of rifles by combining them with the revolving firing mechanism that had been developed earlier for revolving pistols. Colt began experimenting with revolving rifles in the early-19th century, and other manufacturers like Remington later experimented with them as well. The Colt Revolving Rifle Model 1855, an early repeating rifle, became the first to be used by the U.S. Government and saw some limited action during the American Civil War. Revolvers, both rifles and pistols, tend to spray fragments of metal from the front of the cylinder.

== Modern ==
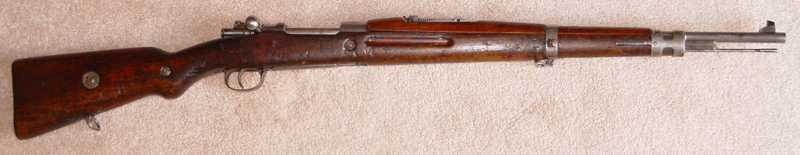
Czechoslovak rifle vz. 24

In the Russo-Japanese War of 1904–1905, military observers from Europe and the United States witnessed a major conflict fought with high velocity bolt-action rifles firing smokeless powder. The Battle of Mukden fought in 1905 consisted of nearly 343,000 Russian troops against over 281,000 Japanese troops. The Russian Mosin–Nagant Model 1891 in 7.62 mm was pitted against the Japanese Arisaka Type 30 bolt-action rifle in 6.5 mm; both had velocities well over 2,000 feet per second (610 m/s).

Until the late 19th century rifles tended to be very long, some long rifles reaching approximately 2 m (7 ft) in length to maximize accuracy, making early rifles impractical for use by cavalry. However, following the advent of more powerful smokeless powder, a shorter barrel did not impair accuracy as much. As a result, cavalry saw limited, but noteworthy, usage in 20th-century conflicts.

The introduction of rapid-fire weapons such as machine guns, submachine guns, and rifled artillery outpaced the development of tactics for attacking defended trenches. During World War I, this contributed to the extensive use of rifles alongside these weapons.

The M1 Garand was a semi-automatic rapid-fire rifle developed for modern warfare use in World War II.

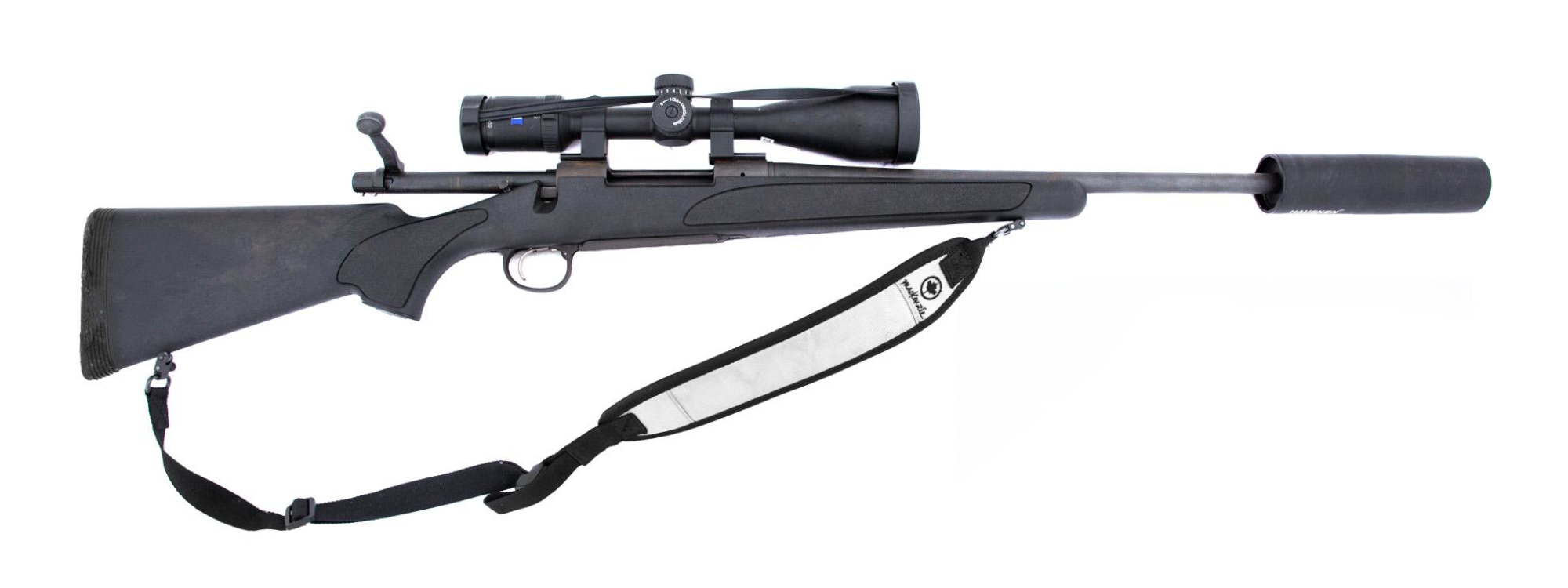
Remington Model 700 in .30-06 Springfield with mounted telescopic sight and suppressor

During and after World War II it became accepted that most infantry engagements occurred at ranges of less than 300 m; the range and power of the large full-powered rifle cartridges were "overkill", requiring weapons heavier than otherwise necessary. This led to Germany's development of the 7.92×33mm Kurz (short) round, the MKb-42, and ultimately, the assault rifle. Today, an infantryman's rifle is optimized for ranges of 300 m or less, and soldiers are trained to deliver individual rounds or bursts of fire within these distances. Typically, the application of accurate, long-range fire is the domain of the marksman and the sniper in warfare, and of enthusiastic target shooters in peacetime. The modern marksman rifle and sniper rifle are usually capable of accuracy better than 0.3 mrad at 100 yards (1 arcminute).

== 3D-printed rifle ==
The Grizzly is a 3D-printed .22-caliber rifle created around August 2013. It was created using a Stratasys Dimension 1200es printer. It was created by a Canadian only known by the pseudonym "Matthew" who told The Verge that he was in his late 20s, and his main job was making tools for the construction industry.

The original Grizzly fired a single shot before breaking. Grizzly 2.0 fired fourteen bullets before getting damaged due to the strain.

In October 2020, another 3D-printed 9mm rifle known as the "FGC-9mm" was created. It is reported that it can be made in 2 weeks with $500 of tools. A second model was later made in April 2021.

== Youth rifle ==
A youth rifle is a rifle designed or modified for fitting children or other small-framed shooters. A youth rifle is often a single-shot .22 caliber rifle, or a bolt-action rifle, although some youth rifles are semi-automatic. They are usually very light, with a greatly shortened length of pull, which is necessary to accommodate children. Youth stocks are available for many popular rifles, such as the Ruger 10/22, a semi-automatic .22 LR rifle, allowing a youth rifle to be made from a standard rifle by simply changing the stock.

== Technical aspects ==
=== Rifling ===
The usual form of rifling was helical grooves in a round bore.

Some early rifled firearms had barrels with a twisted polygonal bore. The Whitworth rifle was the first such type designed to spin the round for accuracy. Bullets for these guns were made to match the shape of the bore so the bullet would grip the rifle bore and take a spin that way. These were generally large caliber weapons, and the ammunition still did not fit tightly in the barrel. Many different shapes and degrees of spiraling were used in experimental designs. One widely produced example was the Metford rifling in the Pattern 1888 Lee–Metford service rifle. Although uncommon, polygonal rifling is still used in some weapons today, one example being the Glock line of pistols (which fire standard bullets). Many of the early designs were prone to dangerous backfiring, which could lead to the destruction of the weapon and serious injury to the person firing it.

=== Barrel wear ===
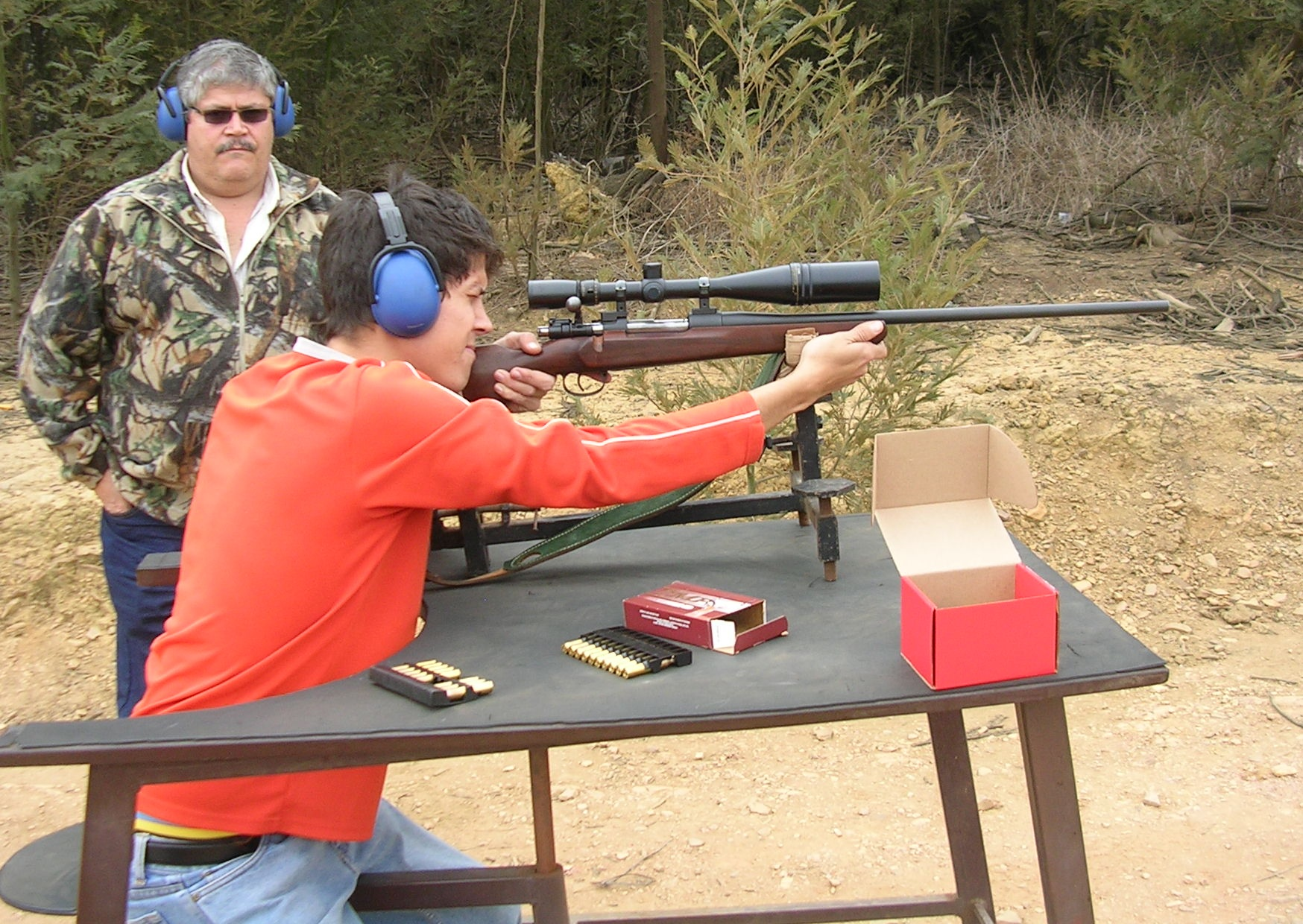
Benchrest shooting with a Mauser rifle

As the bullet enters the barrel, it inserts itself into the rifling, a process that gradually wears down the barrel, and also causes the barrel to heat up more rapidly. Therefore, some machine guns are equipped with quick-change barrels that can be swapped every few thousand rounds, or in earlier designs, were water-cooled. Unlike older carbon steel barrels, which were limited to around 1,000 shots before the extreme heat caused accuracy to fade, modern stainless steel barrels for target rifles are much more resistant to wear, allowing many thousands of rounds to be fired before accuracy drops. (Many shotguns and small arms have chrome-lined barrels to reduce wear and enhance corrosion resistance. This is rare on rifles designed for extreme accuracy, as the plating process is difficult and liable to reduce the effect of the rifling.) Modern ammunition has a hardened lead core with a softer outer cladding or jacket, typically of an alloy of copper and nickel – cupro-nickel. Some ammunition is coated with molybdenum disulfide to further reduce internal friction – the so-called 'moly-coated' bullet.

=== Rate of fire ===
Rifles were initially single-shot, muzzle-loading weapons. During the 18th century, breech-loading weapons were designed, which allowed the rifleman to reload while under cover, but defects in manufacturing and the difficulty in forming a reliable gas-tight seal prevented widespread adoption. During the 19th century, multi-shot repeating rifles using lever, pump or linear bolt actions became standard, further increasing the rate of fire and minimizing the fuss involved in loading a firearm. The problem of proper seal creation had been solved with the use of brass cartridge cases, which expanded in an elastic fashion at the point of firing and effectively sealed the breech while the pressure remained high, then relaxed back enough to allow for easy removal. By the end of the 19th century, the leading bolt-action design was that of Paul Mauser, whose action—wedded to a reliable design possessing a five-shot magazine—became a world standard through two world wars and beyond. The Mauser rifle was paralleled by Britain's ten-shot Lee–Enfield and America's 1903 Springfield Rifle models. The American M1903 closely copied Mauser's original design.

=== Range ===
Barrel rifling increased the range and accuracy of the musket. The development of rifles has included changes in range and accuracy. Following the introduction of the Minié rifle, rifles were used for longer-range fire.

In recent decades, large-caliber anti-materiel rifles, typically firing between 12.7 mm and 20 mm caliber cartridges, have been developed. The US Barrett M82A1 is probably the best-known such rifle. A second example is the AX50 by Accuracy International. These weapons are typically used to strike critical, vulnerable targets such as computerized command and control vehicles, radio trucks, radar antennae, vehicle engine blocks and the jet engines of enemy aircraft. Anti-materiel rifles can be used against human targets, but the much higher weight of rifle and ammunition, and the massive recoil and muzzle blast, usually make them less than practical for such use. The Barrett M82 is designed with a maximum effective range of 1,800 m (1.1 mi), although it has a confirmed kill distance of 2,430 m (1.51 mi) in Afghanistan during Operation Anaconda in 2002. The record for the longest confirmed kill shot stands at 3,540 m (11,610 ft), set by an unnamed soldier with Canada's elite special operations unit Joint Task Force 2 using a McMillan TAC-50 sniper rifle.

=== Bullet rotational speed (RPM) ===
Bullets leaving a rifled barrel can spin at a rotational speed of over 100,000 revolutions per minute (rpm) (or over about 1.67 kilohertz, since 1 RPM = 1/60 Hz). The rotational speed depends both on the muzzle velocity of the bullet and the pitch of the rifling. Excessive rotational speed can exceed the bullet's designed limits and the inadequate centripetal force will fail to keep the bullet from disintegrating in a radial fashion. The rotational speed of the bullet can be calculated by using the formula below.

- MV/twist rate = rotational speed

Using metric units, the formula divides the number of millimeters in a meter (1,000) by the barrel twist in millimeters (the length of travel along the barrel per full rotation). This number is then multiplied by the muzzle velocity in meters per second (m/s) and the number of seconds in a minute (60).

- MV (in m/s) × (1,000 mm /twist) × 60 s/min = Bullet RPM

For example, using a barrel that has a twist rate of 190 mm with a muzzle velocity of 900 m/s:

- 900 m/s × (1,000 mm /(190 mm)) × 60 s/min = 284 210 RPM

Using imperial units, the formula divides the number of inches in a foot (12) by the rate of twist that the barrel has. This number is multiplied by the muzzle velocity (MV) and the number of seconds in a minute (60). For example, a bullet with a muzzle velocity of 3,000 feet per second (910 m/s) leaving a barrel that twists once per foot (1/12") would rotate at 180,000rpm.

- MV (in fps) × (12 in. /twist rate) × 60 s/min. = Bullet RPM

For example, using a barrel that has a twist rate of 1 turn in 8" with a muzzle velocity of 3000 ft/s:

- 3,000 fps × (12"/(8"/rotation)) × 60 s/min. = 270,000 RPM

=== Caliber ===
Rifles may be chambered in a variety of calibers (bullet or barrel diameters), from as low as 4.4 mm (.17 inch) varmint calibers to as high as 20 mm (.80 caliber) in the case of the largest anti-tank rifles. The term caliber essentially refers to the width of the bullet fired through a rifle's barrel. Armies have consistently attempted to find and procure the most lethal and accurate caliber for their firearms.

The standard calibers used by the world's militaries tend to follow worldwide trends. These trends have significantly changed during the centuries of firearm design and re-design. Muskets were normally chambered for large calibers, such as .50 or .59 (12.7 mm or 15 mm), with the theory that these large bullets caused the most damage.

During World War I and II, most rifles were chambered in .30 caliber (7.62 mm), a combination of power and speed. Examples would be the .303 British Lee–Enfield, the American M1903 .30-06, and the German 8mm Mauser K98.

An exception was the Italian Modello 91 rifle, which used the 6.5×52mm Mannlicher–Carcano cartridge.

Detailed study of infantry combat during and after World War II revealed that most small-arms engagements occurred within 100 meters, meaning that the power and range of the traditional .30-caliber weapons (designed for engagements at 500 meters and beyond) were essentially wasted. The single greatest predictor of an individual soldier's combat effectiveness was the number of rounds he fired. Weapons designers and strategists realized that service rifles firing smaller-caliber projectiles would allow troops to carry far more ammunition for the same weight. The lower recoil and more generous magazine capacities of small-caliber weapons also allow troops a much greater volume of fire, compared to historical battle rifles. Smaller, faster traveling, less stable projectiles have also demonstrated greater terminal ballistics and therein, a greater lethality than traditional .30-caliber rounds. Most modern service rifles fire a projectile of approximately 5.56 mm. Examples of firearms in this range are the American 5.56 mm M16 and the Russian 5.45×39mm AK-74.

=== Types of rifle ===
==== By mechanism ====
- Air gun
  - Spring-piston
    - Break barrel
    - Fixed barrel
      - Underlever
      - Sidelever
      - Overlever
  - Pneumatic (internal pressure reservoir)
    - Pump pneumatic, either single-stroke or multi-stroke
    - Pre-charged pneumatic (PCP)
  - Compressed gas (external pressure reservoir)
    - CO_{2}
    - High pressure air (HPA)
- Firearm
  - Single-shot
    - Muzzle-loading rifle, some flintlock and mostly caplock
    - Breech-loading rifle
      - Breechblock rifle, either trapdoor, rolling, dropping, tilting or screwed
      - Break-action rifle
      - Double rifle (list)
  - Repeating
    - Manual
      - Revolving rifle
      - Lever-action rifle, e.g. Winchester rifle, Spencer rifle
      - Pump-action rifle, e.g. Colt Lightning Carbine
      - Bolt-action rifle
        - Turn-pull, e.g. Mauser G98, Lee–Enfield, Mosin-Nagant
        - Straight-pull, e.g. Ross rifle, K31, Mannlicher M1895, Blaser R93/R8
      - Bolt-release rifle, also known as lever-release rifle, e.g. Verney-Carron SpeedLine
    - Self-loading
      - Semi-automatic rifle
      - Automatic rifle
        - Selective-fire rifle

==== By usage ====
- Military and law enforcement
  - Anti-materiel rifle
  - Anti-tank rifle
  - Long rifle
  - Personal defense weapon
  - Precision rifle
    - Designated marksman rifle
    - Sniper rifle (list)
  - Scout rifle
  - Service rifle
    - Assault rifle (list)
    - Battle rifle (list)
    - Carbine (list)
- Civilian
  - Hunting rifle
    - Buffalo rifle
    - Elephant rifle
    - Express rifle
    - Punt gun
    - Varmint rifle
  - Match/target rifle
    - Benchrest rifle
  - Modern sporting rifle
  - Short-barreled rifle
  - Varmint rifle

== See also ==
- Advanced Combat Rifle/Project Abakan
- Antique firearms
- British military rifles
- Gun safety
- Handgun
- List of assault rifles
- List of battle rifles
- List of multiple barrel rifles
- List of rifle cartridges
- List of sniper rifles
- Objective Individual Combat Weapon
- Rifle grenade
- Rifling
- Rifled musket
- Service rifle
- Shooting
- Shooting at the Summer Olympics
- Shooting range
- Shooting sport
- Shotgun
- Silencer (firearms)
- Submachine gun
- Telescopic sight
- Precision-guided firearm
