= François Tamisier =

French engineer

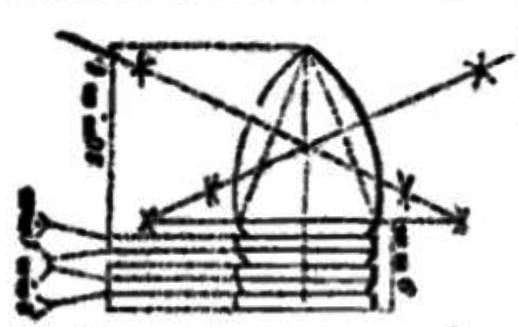
Tamisier grooves ("Cannelures")

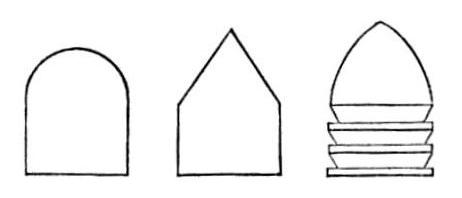
Cylindro-spherical (left) and cylindro-conical bullets (middle) developed by Delvigne, were improved with stabilizing bullet grooves developed by Tamisier

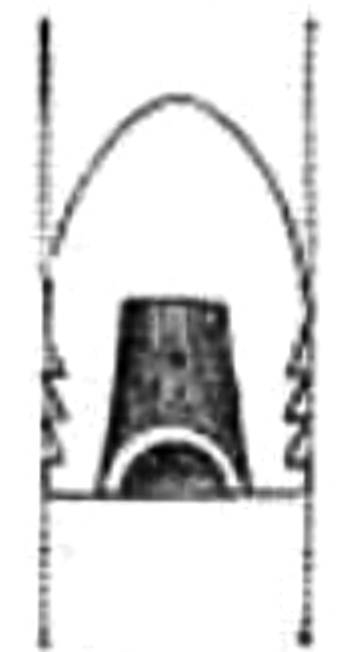
Tamisier grooves in a Minié ball

François Tamisier (French: [tamizje]; 22 January 1809, Lons-le-Saunier, Jura – 20 May 1880, Paris) was a French artillery captain of the 19th century. He invented various methods to improve the rifled gun, particularly ball grooves (not to be confused with the Minié ball).

== Ball grooves ==
Captain Tamisier obtained a patent in 1841 for a method to improve the accuracy of cylindro-conical shot, by cutting three sharp grooves (French: "cannelures") on the cylindrical part of the shot.

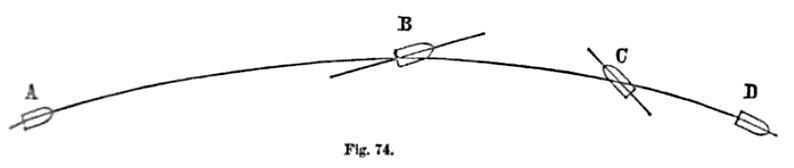
Before Tamisier's invention, the orientation of a cylindro-conical bullet would tend to remain along its inertial axis, progressively setting it against its trajectory and increasingly meeting air resistance, which would render the bullet's movement erratic.

Compared to round shots, which offered a rather inefficient but symmetric and stable aerodynamic round profile, the aerodynamic stability of the cylindro-conical shot had been an issue in early rifled weapons of the type developed by Delvigne. Through Tamisier's method, the resistance of the air behind the center of gravity of the shot was increased, thereby increasing its stability.

The Tamisier grooves greatly improved the efficiency of the cylindro-conical bullet. However they rendered the forcing of the bullet against the grooves of the rifle bore in the Delvigne system rather difficult. To accommodate this difficulty, the stem rifle was developed by Thouvenin. These principles were later incorporated in the design of the Minié ball.

== Progressive rifle grooves ==
Tamisier also developed a method for making rifle grooves, which was original in that the grooves were deeper at the breech and progressively shallower towards the muzzle. This provided for a progressive forcing of the ball as it moved through the barrel, greatly improving its efficiency.
