= Pattern 1851 Minié rifle =

Rifled musket

Pattern 1851 Minié Rifle
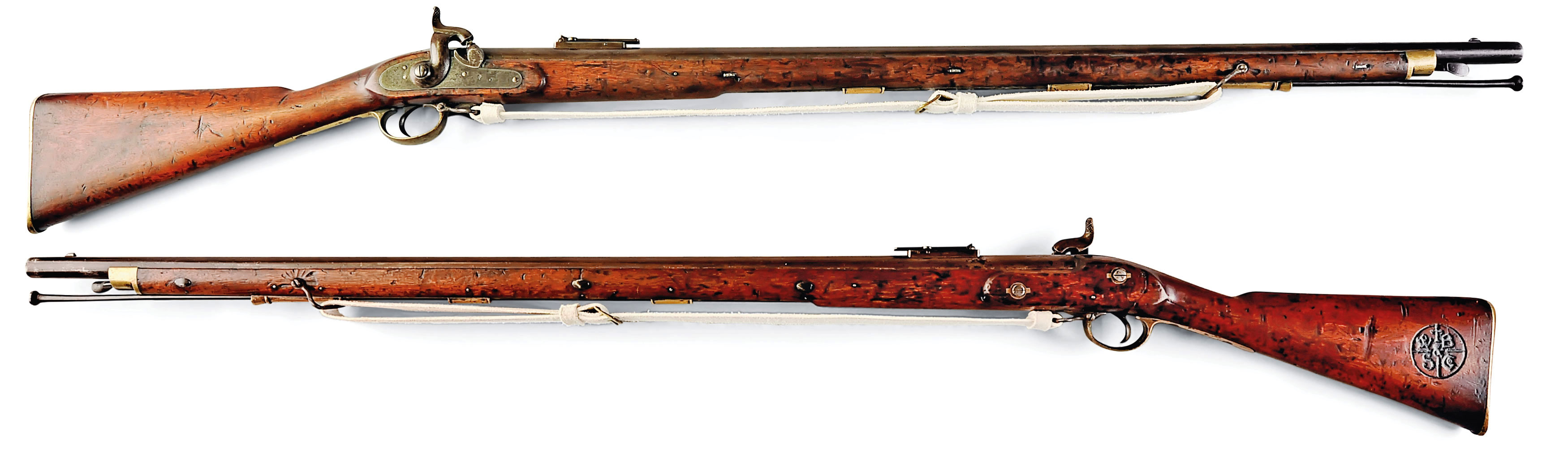
- The 1851 Minié Rifle
- Type: Rifled musket
- Place of origin: United Kingdom

Service history
- In service: 1851–1855
- Used by: British Empire; Confederate States of America; Qing China
- Wars: Xhosa Wars; Crimean War; Australian frontier wars; Indian Mutiny; Second Opium War; New Zealand Wars; American Civil War; Nian Rebellion; Taiping Rebellion

Production history
- Manufacturer: Royal Small Arms Factory; Holland & Son; W. Adams
- Developed from: Pattern 1842 smoothbore musket
- Produced: 1851–1855
- No. built: 35,000

Specifications
- Length: 55 inches

The Pattern 1851 Minié Rifle (also known as the Pattern 1851 Minié, Pattern 1851 Enfield, P51 Enfield, and P51 Minié) was a .702 caliber Minié-type muzzle-loading rifled musket, used by the British Empire from roughly 1851 to 1855. As a transitional weapon between the Brown Bess and the Pattern 1853 Enfield, the Pattern 1851 Minié Rifle saw very brief use in the Xhosa Wars, the Crimean War, and the Australian frontier wars among others before being replaced by the Pattern 1853 Enfield. The rifle was nicknamed "The Destroying Angel" for its destructive role in the Battle of Inkerman.

== History ==
Previous to the adoption of the percussion cap system the majority of the British Army and its colonies were armed with Brown Bess, a smoothbore flintlock musket. Following the Pattern 1839 Brown Bess, a percussion conversion, the .753 caliber Pattern 1842 smoothbore musket was quickly adopted. Specialized rifles, such as the Baker rifle and Brunswick rifle which served in the Napoleonic Wars, saw use only by specialist rifle regiments such as the Rifle Brigade (The Prince Consort's Own), however, the adoption of a standardized rifled musket had yet to be adopted by the British military and much of continental Europe. The drawback of smoothbore muskets at the time were their inaccuracy and long distances. Generally speaking, armies considered shots beyond 140 meters to be ineffective while utilizing smoothbore muskets. The invention of the Minié ball and the Minié rifle by Claude-Étienne Minié and Henri-Gustave Delvigne would drastically change the field of warfare in Europe. The British military decided in 1851 to adopt the Minié rifle as its standard rifle under the designation Pattern 1851 or P51. The Duke of Wellington played a pivotal role in the British Army’s procurement of the P1851 rifle musket. His endorsement was essential in securing the approval of the Master General of the Ordnance, the Marquis of Anglesey, to transition the infantry from muskets to rifles. Wellington’s support remained conditional upon the new ammunition maintaining a weight parity with existing musket round balls and cartridges.

== Design ==
Sketch of the P51 rifled-musket

In 1851 the Royal Small Arms Factory began production of the .702-inch (17.8 mm) Pattern 1851 Minié rifle using the conical minie bullet, which had its origins in development from the earlier cylindro-conoidal bullet designed by English Captain John Norton and William Greener. The rifle itself was almost identical to the Pattern 1842 smoothbore musket, with the exception that it was caliber .702 instead of the P42's caliber .753. The P51 Minié rifle had a barrel that was 39 inches long with a four grooved 1:78 twist, the rifle's overall length was 55 inches. The rifle featured a rear sight ladder which was graduated to 900 yards. The P51 was designed to accept the 17-inch bladed-triangular socket bayonet which also fit the P42.

== Military use ==
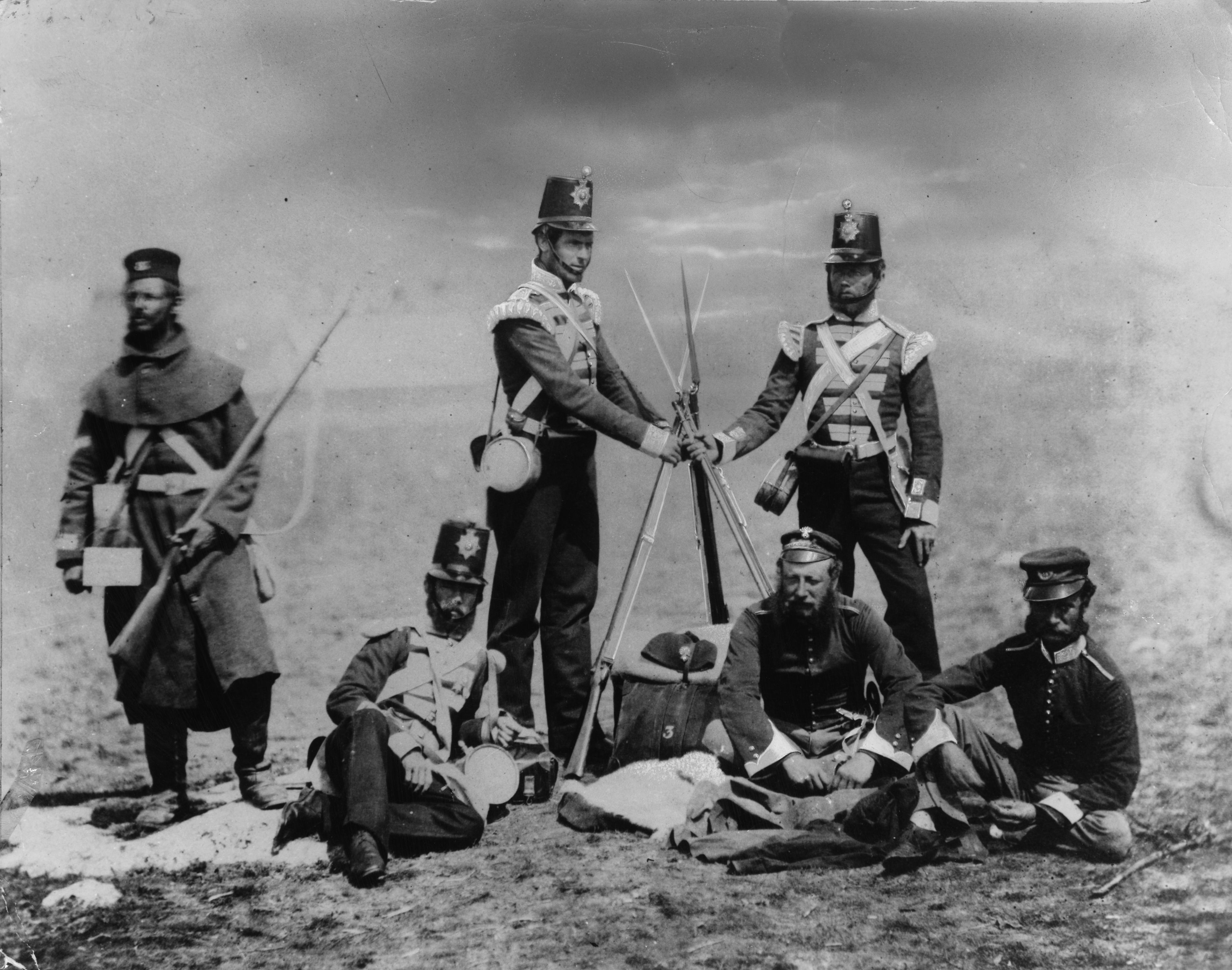
Officers and men of the Buffs (Royal East Kent Regiment) in 1855 during the Crimean War. The enlisted men are armed with the P51 Minié Rifle

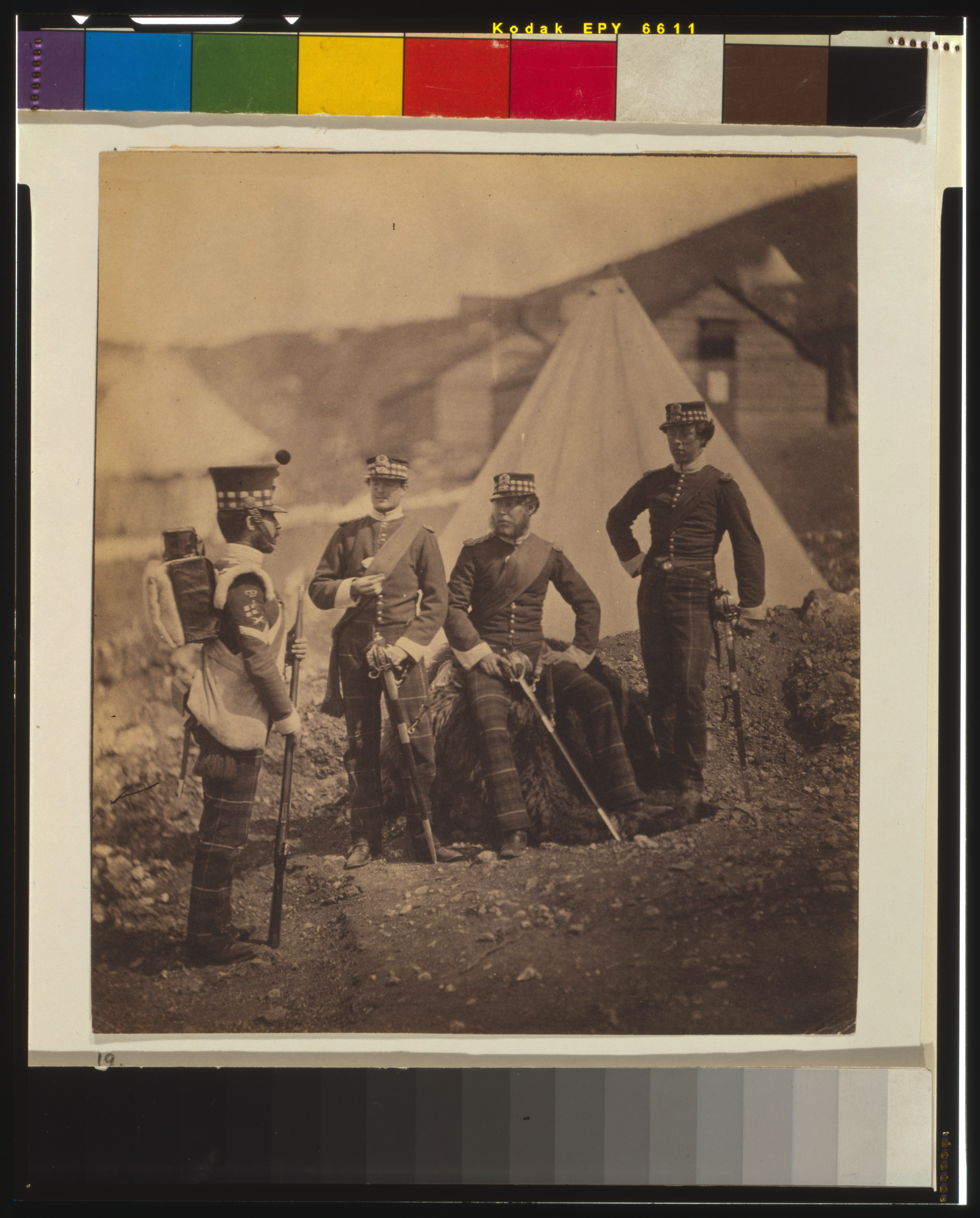
Group of the 71st (Highland) Regiment of Foot with Colour Sergeant in 1855. The Colour Sergeant (left) is wielding a P51 Minié Rifle

The first military use of the Pattern 1851 Minié rifle was during the Xhosa Wars in modern-day South Africa from 1846 to 1852. The majority of the British military by this point in time was still armed with the P42 smoothbore musket, however, six selected soldiers in each company were armed with the P51 Minié rifle and designated as marksmen. These marksmen were typically led by a non-commissioned officer as skirmishers or flankers. The rifle had purported success during the Cape Wars and was capable at times of engaging past 1,200 yards.

Despite the issuance and development of the Pattern 1853 Enfield, some 17,000 P51 Minié rifles still saw use in the Crimean War from 1854 to 1856. Roughly three of the four divisions of the British field army in Crimea were armed with the P51, other regiments carried the older and obsolete Pattern 1842 smoothbore muskets. During the Battle of Inkerman in 1854 the rifle received the nickname "The Destroying Angel". By the end of the Crimean War the P51 Minié rifle had become outclassed by other rifles of its time including the newer Pattern 1853 Enfield.

The P51 Minié rifle saw limited use in other British colonial conflicts including the Indian Rebellion of 1857, the Eureka Rebellion, the Opium Wars, the Australian frontier wars, and the New Zealand Wars. Roughly 14,900 P51's were sold to the Confederate States of America during the American Civil War for 40 shillings each. Confederate records identify the Pattern 1851 rifle through various nomenclatures, including "Brown Bess Rifles 1851 Pattern," and "Rifled Brown Bessies" among others. Near the middle of the 19th century, P51's were used by troops of the Ever Victorious Army in both the Nian Rebellion and the Taiping Rebellion alongside the P53 Enfield and Sharps rifle.^{:19} The Ever Victorious Army was one of the first Chinese armies to utilize a combination of both European and British firearms.^{:19}
