= Brunswick rifle =

Brunswick Rifle
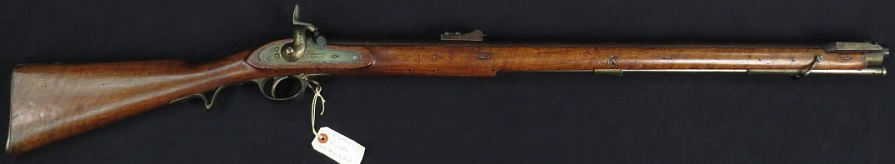
- Type: Muzzle-loading rifle
- Place of origin: United Kingdom

Service history
- In service: 1836−1851
- Used by: British Empire; United States; Confederate States; Russia; Belgium; Nepal
- Wars: British colonial conflicts Crimean War; American Civil War; Russo-Turkish War

Production history
- Designed: 1836
- Produced: 1836–1885

Specifications
- Mass: 10 pounds (4.5 kg)
- Barrel length: 30 inches (760 mm)
- Cartridge: Lead ball
- Calibre: 0.704 inches (17.9 mm)
- Action: Percussion lock
- Rate of fire: User dependent; usually 3–4 rounds a minute
- Effective firing range: 300 yards
- Feed system: Muzzle-loaded

The Brunswick rifle was a large calibre (0.704 inches or 17.9 millimetres) muzzle-loading percussion rifle manufactured for the British Army at the Royal Small Arms Factory at Enfield in the early 19th century. Its name is derived from the historical German state of Brunswick because the British were experimenting with Hanoverian percussion cap technology during the period Great Britain and Hanover had the same head of state.

It was introduced into British service in 1836 and remained as the standard service rifle up until 1851, when it was partially replaced by the Minié rifle (the Pattern 1851) before both began to be replaced by Pattern 1853 Enfield rifled musket.

== History ==
In the early 19th century there was some criticism about the performance of the Baker rifle. In 1808, Colonel Henry Beaufoy argued in his book Scloppetaria or Considerations on the Nature and Use of Rifled Barrel Guns that the Baker rifle was only accurate at short ranges. He criticized the fact that gunmakers were forced to strike a balance between accuracy and durability on the battlefield of the Baker rifle. Baker gave several reasons for his choice of rifling. With only a quarter turn in thirty inches, the barrel was less prone to fouling from frequent firing than barrels with whole, three-quarter or half turns. Historical records show that the Baker rifle rarely caused such problems during its thirty-five years of service. However, to some extent, accuracy was reduced, particularly in some of the Birmingham-made rifles during the Napoleonic Wars.

In 1828, these issues were brought to the Ordnance, prompting a review of the suitability of the existing rifle. Until 1836, George Lovell (Inspector of Small Arms) examined several rifles on behalf of the Board of Ordnance, but none of them proved satisfactory in the tests. In February 1836, Lovell produced a model of his own. The twist of this rifling had a three-quarter turn in the thirty inches of the barrel, giving the bullet more rotation but less friction. To improve accuracy, the stock was not as straight as the Baker's, and the iron furniture was blued or case-hardened to avoid the glare of brass. It also featured a back-action percussion lock, a fixed backsight for 200 yards and a folding leaf for 300 yards, as well as a sword bayonet.

In the meantime, the Duke of Brunswick had had manufactured a rifle which was also had submitted to Lovell. It had a barrel 39 inches (990 mm) long with two wide round grooves making a complete turn. During tests, this rifle demonstrated excellent performance. Despite this, Maj. Dundas and the Woolwich Committee were less impressed, acknowledging its precision at long ranges but criticizing its heavy weight and complicated loading process. They considered it unmanageable for troops. Lovell persisted, suggesting that the two-groove barrel was superior to the eleven-grooved variant. With the design agreed upon and materials ordered, urgent tests on six of his two-groove rifles were conducted by a committee of officers led by Maj.-Gen Millar in November and December.

The rifle resembled the original eleven-grooved model, but with the Brunswick rifling, which was made to a calibre of .654 inches (16.6 mm). The twist had also been increased to a complete turn. Where the rifling left the muzzle, two semi-circular notches into which the ball's belt was fitted, making loading much easier. The rifle weighed around 9 pounds, and the bayonet had a more substantial handle and a 22-inch blade. In place of the round lug on the barrel was a flat bar with a notch facing the muzzle. Lovell moved the bayonet bar farther away from the muzzle, thereby removing the bayonet handle as an obstacle to clear vision when the bayonet was attached. In January 1837 the first 2,000 Brunswick rifles were ordered.

The Brunswick rifle was predominantly issued to specialized marine light infantry units, including the Rifle Brigade and the elite 60th (King's Royal Rifle Corps), given their specific operational demands during the First Opium War.

The Confederacy procured approximately 2,020 Brunswick rifles through agent Caleb Huse, illustrating the South’s reliance on European imports to supplement its limited domestic arms production during the war effort.

Russia had over 20,000 Brunswick patterns at the start of the conflict with the Ottoman Empire in the 1870s.

== Design and features ==
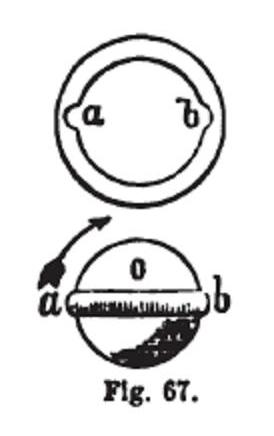
Girdled bullet and twin rifle groove of the Brunswick rifle

The Brunswick had a two groove barrel designed to accept a "belted" round ball. Like all rifles of the period, the Brunswick rifle suffered from the problem of being difficult to load. Rounds for rifles were required to fit tightly into the barrel so that the round would grip the rifling as it traveled down the barrel, imparting a spin to the round and improving its stability. Even though the rib and groove design of the Brunswick allowed it to use rounds that did not fit quite as tightly, the black powder utilized during this period would quickly foul the barrel, making even the Brunswick's design more and more difficult to load as the rifle was used.

The lock was originally a back action design, with the mainspring located behind the hammer. This design proved to be unpopular because it weakened the wrist of the stock. Later Brunswick rifles featured a more conventional side action lock. The stock was made of walnut, and featured a straight wrist and a low comb butt. A patch box with a hinged brass lid was located on the right side of the butt. Originally, the Brunswick rifle used a single compartment patch box. Later rifles used a slightly larger patch box with two compartments.

The ramrod pipes, trigger guard, and butt plate were all made of polished brass. The rifle was designed to accept a sword type bayonet which mounted by use of a bayonet bar, similar to the design of that used on the Baker rifle. The bayonet bar was relocated further back due to problems that had been experienced with the Baker rifle. The Brunswick rifle used a block front sight and a two position folding leaf rear sight which could be set for either 200 or 300 yards (180 or 270 m). The rifle weighed approximately 9 to 10 lb (4.1 to 4.5 kg) (depending on the pattern) without the bayonet attached.

== Variants ==
The Pattern 1836 featured the original back action lock and the single compartment patch box. The first of these were 0.654 inches (16.6 mm) caliber. This was changed fairly early in the rifle's life, and most were 0.704 inches (17.9 mm) caliber. All subsequent patterns were 0.704 inches (17.9 mm) caliber. The Pattern 1840 featured a dual compartment patch box, and had several minor improvements to the Pattern 1836.

The Pattern 1841 replaced the back action lock with a side lock. However, this lock change was not put into manufacturing until 1845. This version also used a wrought iron barrel instead of twisted steel, and a simple plug that replaced the break-off breech plug used in earlier patterns. The Pattern 1848 featured other minor improvements, and used an improved bayonet latch with the locking notch located halfway along the bayonet bar on its upper side. Only a few batches of rifles produced for the British Army were fitted with this improvement.

The M1843 Luttich Carbine was formally adopted by Russia, serving as a rifled counterpart to the standard smoothbore muskets utilized by the military at that time. Аn initial contract for 10,000 carbines was made by the Belgian firm PJ Malherbe & Cie, located in Liège (known in German as Lüttich). A second contract for 3,000 was made in 1855 by Falisse & Trapmann. The rifle incorporated a 30-inch Damascus-twist barrel, with a nominal .70 caliber, featuring two-groove rifling designed to complete one full turn along the barrel to impart spin to its projectiles, adopted a new cone-shaped bullet based on the Lancaster design, which it called Kulikovskay or, shorter, the Kulikov. The Luttich Carbine represented the primary rifled firearm extensively utilized by Russian forces during the Crimean War, predominantly by specialized rifle units. The operational insights gained from the Brunswick-influenced Luttich highlighted the imperative for a contemporary, widely distributed rifled musket. As a direct result, the Russian Ordnance Board conceived and implemented the 6-line Model 1856 Rifle-Musket, thereby transitioning the national military from a largely smoothbore armament to a standardized rifled infantry weapon system. This strategic shift significantly advanced Russian military capabilities, aligning them with prevailing European benchmarks.

== See also ==
- Pattern 1861 Enfield musketoon, a shorter rifle musket of very similar design
- British military rifles
- Rifles in the American Civil War

== Bibliography ==
- Bailey, De Witt (1971). British Military Longarms, 1715-1815. Harrisburg: Stackpole Books.
- Blackmore, Howard L. (1994). British Military Firearms, 1650-1850. London: Greenhill Books. ISBN 1-85367-172-X.
- Duckers, Peter (2005). British Military Rifles: 1800 - 2000. Oxford: Shire. ISBN 978-0-7478-0633-2.
- Németh, Balász (2020). Early Military Rifles 1740-1850. Oxford: Osprey. ISBN 978-1-4728-4231-2.
