= Cylindro-conoidal bullet =

Type of muzzleloading projectile

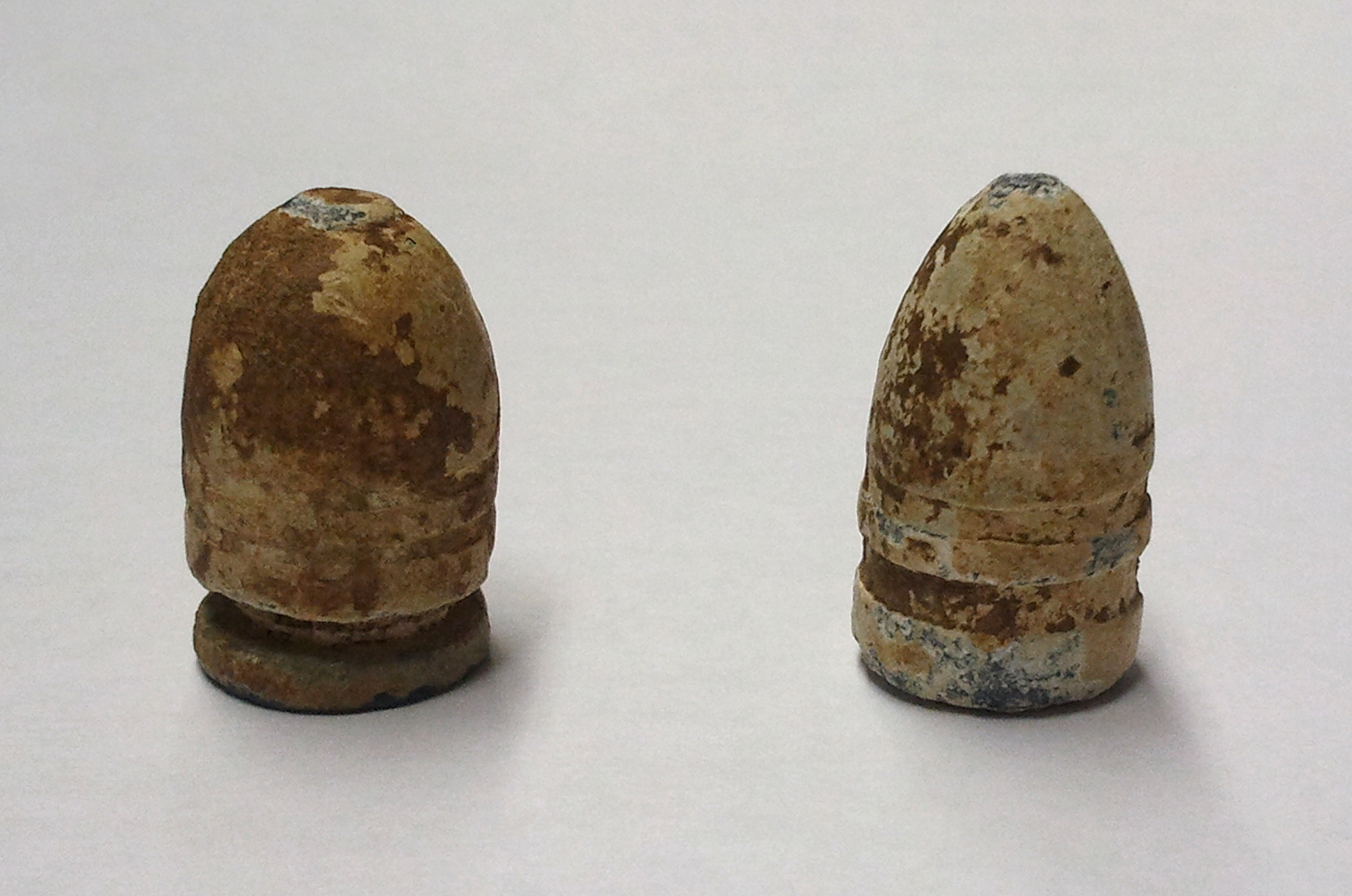
Two Civil War cylindro-conoidal Minié balls

The cylindro-conoidal bullet is a type of muzzleloading firearm projectile with a convexly cone-like front end ("nose") and a cylindrical rear body, invented by Captain John Norton of the British 34th Regiment in 1832. It had a cavitied base, so when fired, the thin concavity wall ("skirt") would expand outwards and seal up the bore diameter. The origin of his idea is an interesting one: when in southern British India, he examined the blow pipe darts used by the natives and found that their base was formed of elastic lotus pith, which by its expansion against the inner surface of the blow pipe prevented the leakage of air past it.

In 1836, Mr. W. Greener, a London-based gunsmith, improved on Norton's bullet design by inserting a conoidal wooden plug into its base. Although both inventions were rejected by the British Ordnance Department, the idea was taken up in France, and in 1849 Claude-Étienne Minié adopted Greener's design and produced the "Minié ball". The Austrian developed their own M1847 bullet called Spitzkugel ("pointed pellet" in German) for Delvigne-style Model 1849 Kammerbüchse. Kingdom of Saxony made similar design for Thouvenin breechblock system. The Kulikov bullet was a conically-shaped, two-groove projectile adopted by the Russian army in 1848 for Model 1843 Luttich Rifle, which compete with Britain newly P1851 Enfield rifle.

== See also ==
- Glossary of firearms terminology
