= Tabatière rifle =

French breech-loading rifle

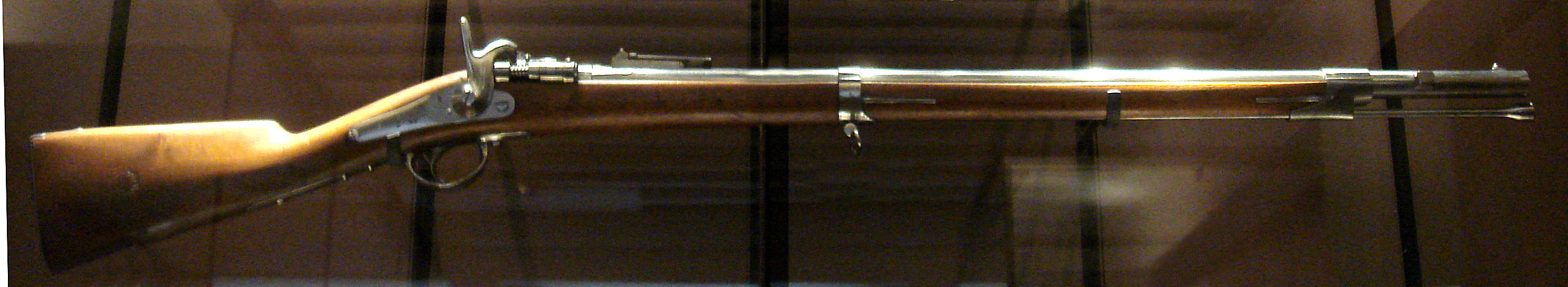
- Tabatière carbine, 1867
- Type: Breech-loading rifle
- Place of origin: French Empire

Service history
- In service: 1864-1878 (primary served in French Army)
- Used by: France (limited); Argentina; Qajar Iran; Kingdom of Siam
- Wars: Franco-German War; Paraguayan War (limited use); Argentine Civil Wars

Production history
- Designer: François Eugène Schneider (possibly)
- Designed: 1857
- Produced: 1864-1870
- No. built: c. 350,000
- Variants: See variants

Specifications
- Cartridge: 18×35mmR metallic cartridge, Minié ball
- Caliber: 18mm calibre (roughly .070)
- Action: Side-hinged brass breech block
- Feed system: Single-shot

The Tabatière rifle was a breech-loading rifle of the French Army. These rifles were typically not issued to regular front-line troops, but were instead allocated to irregular forces and militia.

== Overview ==
The Tabatière system was developed from 1864 as a way to convert numerous muzzle-loading weapons (usually Minié rifles) into breech-loading ones, in a process similar to that of the Snider-Enfield in Great Britain, Wänzl rifle in Austria, and the Springfield Model 1866 in the United States. The name "Tabatière" comes from the fact that the breech-loading mechanism looked like a snuff box.

== History ==
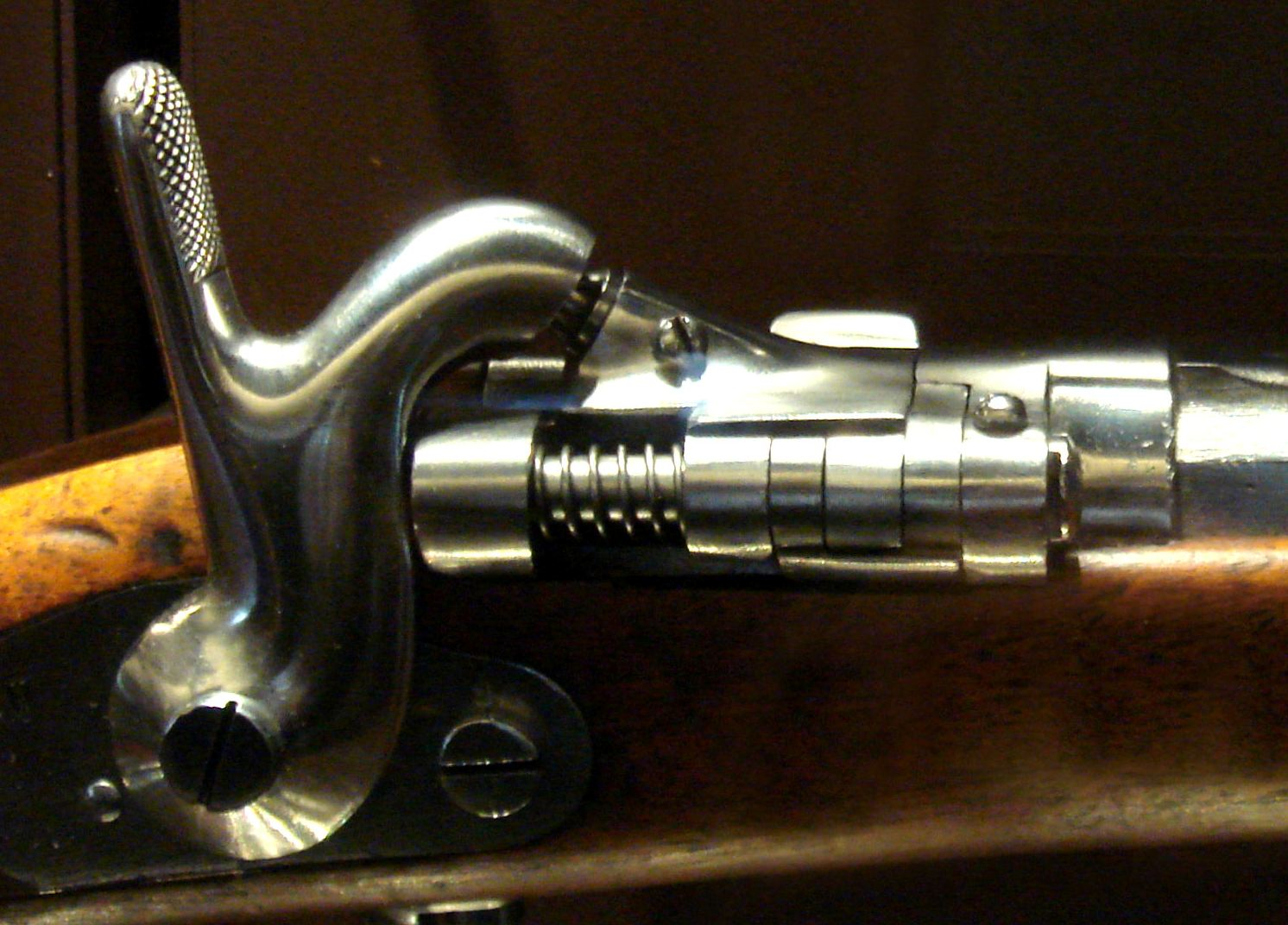
French Tabatière mechanism, 1867.

The Tabatière was developed from an alteration of the Model 1853/1857 Musket Chasseur. Certain Model 1822 flintlock muskets were upgraded during the 1840s to feature percussion cap and rifled barrels.

Most of the conversion work had been accomplished by the time of the Franco-Prussian War. By July 1870, roughly 358,000 rifles had been converted, while 1.4 million muzzleloaders stayed in their original configuration. This weapon system was recognized as ballistically inferior to the Chassepot rifle, therefore it was used by second line troops and in defensive roles. Because St. Étienne, Châtellerault, Tulle, and Mutzig were overwhelmed built needle gun, the French government contracted private commercial gunsmiths to perform the Tabatière conversions. Following the France's defeat and subsequent adoption of the more advanced Gras rifle in 1874, the Tabatière was rapidly decommissioned from active service.

The M1847 socket bayonet was issued for infantry and dragoon rifles as well as the Gendarmerie carbine; conversely, the Carabine de Chasseur Tabatière utilized the Mle1842 M.59 yatagan saber bayonet.

The Type 1 Tabatière is primarily characterized by its thick, squared-off thumb lever. The firing pin is secured by a screw positioned at the top of the breechblock, specifically within the raised ridge through which the mechanism operates. While the system closely parallels the British Snider Marks I and II, the French variant presents a challenge due to the increased weight of the breechblock, which significantly raises the risk of inadvertent opening. This issue was subsequently mitigated through the engineering of the Type 2 receiver. The Type 2 breechblock features a half-round thumb lever mechanism, offering a more refined and streamlined aesthetic compared to the Type 1 iteration. This component is secured in the closed position by a V-shaped spring steel strip, which is fixed via a retaining screw positioned through an aperture at its apex and seated within a dedicated slot on the rear of the breechblock. Type 3 variants have been identified exclusively in post-Imperial, wartime bronze-receiver configurations. These are frequently classified as "Zulu Guns," resulting from the late 19th-century practice of converting rifles into shotguns for affordable distribution.

The M1868 Belgian Terssen has a similar action mechanism to Tabatière, which used to convert Japanese Enfield.

=== In other countries ===
Argentina acquired small amounts during the Paraguayan war. A number were imported from Germany and France in 1880 along with 500,000 cartridges. Those rifles were shipped without bayonets, and were adapted to use old muzzleloader bayonets. 30,000 Captured Tabatière rifles were purchased by Persia from Germany in 1873. Examples have been found with the Thai acceptance markings on the rifle.

== Models ==
Infantry

- Fusil d’Infanterie Mle1867
- Fusil d’Infanterie Mle1822T.bis/1867

Dragoon

- Fusil de dragon Mle1867, known as Voltigeur rifle

Carbine

- Mle1867 Carabine de Chasseurs

Musketoon

- Mousqueton de Gendarmerie Mle1867

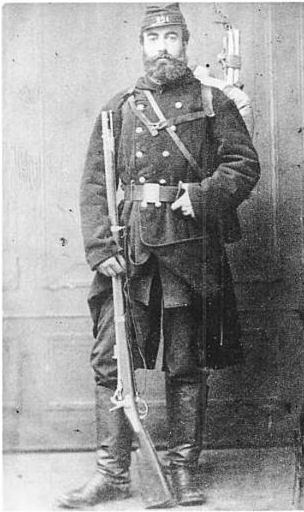
French Garde Mobile soldier with Tabatière rifle, 1870.

== Cartridge ==
The 18x35mmR was constructed similarly to a shotgun shell, in that it had a copper base with a paper tube for the body. There were two loadings, though interchangeable, meant for the rifle and carbine respectively. The rifle cartridge used a blue paper wrap and had a powder load of 5 grams with a 48 gram projectile. The carbine load used a brown paper wrap and had powder load of 4.5 grams with a 36 gram minie ball projectile.

== See also ==
- Krnka, side-breech-loading rifle
- Joslyn rifle

== Notes ==
Preceded by Minié rifle	French Army rifle 1864–1870	Succeeded by Chassepot
