= Minié rifle =

Infantry rifle of the mid-19th century

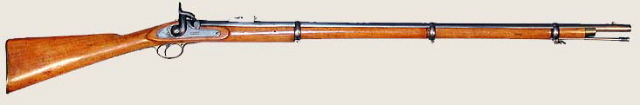
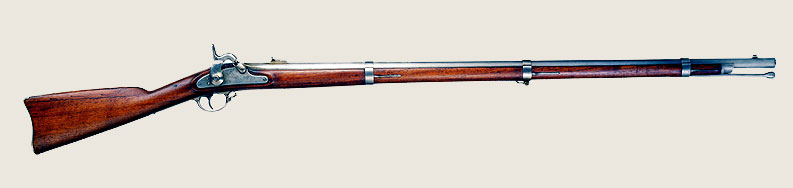
- The Pattern 1853 Enfield and the Springfield Model 1861. Two prominent Minié rifles of the 19th century.
- Type: Service rifle
- Place of origin: France

Service history
- Used by: See § Users
- Wars: Taiping Rebellion; Crimean War; Indian Rebellion of 1857; Second Italian War of Independence; American Civil War; French intervention in Mexico; Paraguayan War; Second Schleswig War; Austro-Prussian War; Mito Rebellion; French Intervention in Joseon; French conquest of Vietnam; Boshin War; Shizoku anti-revolutionary; War of the Pacific; French conquest of Tunisia; First Sino-Japanese War

Production history
- Designer: Claude-Étienne Minié
- Designed: 1849
- Unit cost: $20 (1861)

Specifications
- Cartridge: 18mm rimmed lead balle minié
- Caliber: .71 in (18 millimetres)
- Action: Caplock
- Rate of fire: User dependent 3-4 rounds per minute
- Muzzle velocity: 900 ft/s (270 m/s) – 1,250 ft/s (380 m/s)
- Effective firing range: up to 600 yards
- Maximum firing range: 1000 yards
- Feed system: Muzzle-loading

The Minié rifle was a rifled musket used by the infantry of a number of countries in the mid-19th century. A version was adopted in Britain for a short time in 1851 but the French Army only officially adopted it in 1857. This came after the invention of the Minié ball in 1849 by the French Army captain Claude-Étienne Minié of the Chasseurs d'Orléans and Henri-Gustave Delvigne. The bullet was designed to allow rapid muzzle loading of rifles and was an innovation that brought about the widespread use of the rifle as the main battlefield weapon for individual soldiers.

== Mechanism ==
The rifle used a conical-cylindrical shaped soft lead bullet, slightly smaller than the barrel bore, with three exterior grease-filled peripheral grooves and a conical hollow in its base. When fired, the expanding gas forcibly pushed on the skirted base of the bullet, spreading it to engage the rifling. This provided spin for accuracy, a better seal for consistent velocity and longer range, and cleaning of barrel detritus.

Before this innovation, the smoothbore musket commonly using the buck and ball was the only practical field weapon. Rifled muskets had been in use since the Renaissance, but they required hammering projectiles with a ramrod and mallet into the bore of the barrel, and also created considerable cleaning problems. The short-lived "carabine à tige" system used a pin at the bottom of the barrel which deformed the bullet against the wall of the barrel when the bullet was pushed to the bottom. This system was very problematic for cleaning, especially with the black powders of the period.

A test in Vincennes in 1849 demonstrated that at 15 yards the bullet was able to penetrate two boards of poplar wood, each two-thirds of an inch thick and separated by 20 inches. Soldiers of the time spread rumors that at 1,200 yards the bullet could penetrate a soldier and his knapsack and still kill anyone standing behind him, even killing every person in a line of 15.

The Minié rifle saw limited distribution in the Crimean War and similar rifles using Minié bullets (such as the Pattern 1853 Enfield, the Springfield Model 1861 and the Lorenz rifle) were the dominant infantry weapons in the American Civil War. The large-caliber, easily deformed conical lead bullets, ranging in diameter from .54 to .58 inches (14-18mm), combined with the high-speed spin from the rifling, created terrible wounds.

== Use ==
The Pattern 1851 Minié rifle was in use by the British Army from 1851 to 1855. The British Minié rifles were manufactured according to the Belgian design, following approval from the Duke of Wellington. 34,000 were made under the formal name of Regulation Minié rifle. The rifle was .702 caliber with the intent that in emergency it could fire musket balls. In practice it was found that only about 12 could be fired before it became impossible to reload.

In 1852, Captain Neindorff proposed such a hollow-like bullet. The outbreak of the Crimean War prompted neutral Prussia to convert 300,000 legacy muskets for use with Minié-type ammunition, reflecting a mid-19th-century industrial transition toward rifled arms that significantly enhanced infantry accuracy and range. However, quickly replaced by needle rifle reform, other German states chose to adapt Minié.

The Minié system was also used extensively by various manufacturers, such as Springfield (the Springfield Model 1861) and Enfield (the Pattern 1853 Enfield).

Regarding the Model 1822T flintlock muskets dating from the Bourbon Restoration period, the U.S. Ordnance Department procured thousands of these legacy firearms during the initial months of the conflict. The precise volume acquired by the Union is difficult to verify, as the official shipping of 147,000-188,054 units by the end of 1862 encompasses all French-origin firearms, including those sourced from Belgium, which were capable of chambering the various caliber Minié ball. While the Confederacy prioritized the acquisition of high-performance weaponry, such as Enfield and Lorenz rifle-muskets, they also secured various large-bore, converted French and Belgian M1857 muskets, some of which remained in active service until the war's conclusion.

The Model 1857 Système-Minié rifled muskets used .71-caliber ammunition, with 18-inch sword bayonets equipped by the Foreign Legion (including including Swiss, Germans, Poles, Italians, Spaniards, Dutch, Belgians and English) in the Mexican campaign. Belgian Legion was equipped with its own Enfield Special Model M1856 rather than the standard copy French percussion M1842T/59 and the Pattern Francotte M1849/56, which was a Belgian-made Minié-type rifle.

The Brazilian Model 1857 Espingarda Minié, cal. .583 (14.8 mm), is similar to the Spanish Enfield model, though it is slightly larger, placing it in the same family as the French Minié and the .58-caliber rifles that dominated the U.S. Civil War. The Model 1858 Brazilian Light Minié Rifle and Brazilian Short "Böker" rifles, also made by O.P. Drissen & Cie of Liège, Six thousand of these rifles were imported into the United States by Hermann Boker in late 1860 and early 1861. These rifles were sold on the open market in New York City, with many purchased by New York State and Ohio. The Brazilian Minié rifles also found their way into Confederate hands, where the Union eagle was removed from the stock, and one well-known photograph shows a young Confederate soldier (KIA) in a trench at Fort Mahone in Petersburg.

The royal Danish troops were issued M1831/48s converted from original smoothbore muskets and M1828/46/59 rifle influenced from Kingdom of Saxony M1851/M1857 (Dresden) rifles, as well as M1822/40 Minié-type rifle conversions. Most were old; 20,000 were purchased from France during the First Schleswig War.

Minié rifles were imported in Japan by the Tokugawa shogunate and the rebel Chōshū and Satsuma forces in 1862, other common Minié copy of an 1865 Gewehr rifle, imported by the Dutch firm PT Snider, and used in the Boshin War (1868–1869); While the Shogunate forces were largely armed with obsolete matchlock muskets with only centrally controlled forces equipped with imported rifles, the Chōshū westernized forces were all equipped with Miniés, allowing them to score early decisive victories against the more numerous Shogunate armies. A domestically produced Japanese replica of the Minié rifle, modeled after the 1855 British Enfield.

Rifled musket were distribute to early Vietnamese auxiliaries, Cochinchinese tirailleurs saigonais under Imperial France.

By October 1866, when the Fusiliers Marins sailed from Yokohama to Korea, the conversion program was still in its infancy. The Yokohama garrison almost certainly still carried the Model 1842 and original Mle 1853/57 as a muzzle-loader.

Throughout the samurai rebellions of 1874–1877, Minié rifles remained in use by both factions, even as they were increasingly superseded by the adoption of breech-loading technology.

The rifled musket was thus a secondary weapon in Chile's arsenal, not the mainstay. The Minié was one of the most common rifles in the Peruvian Army at the outbreak of the war, alongside the French Chassepot. Peruvian historian Jorge Basadre noted that under Castilla's second term, infantry armament had been "unified with the so-called Minié rifles," replacing older flintlock and percussion pieces. Peru's arsenal was notably heterogeneous; it also included Comblain and Peabody breech-loading guns.

The P1851 Minié rifle saw limited use by the Mongol irregular cavalrymen serving in the Northern Border Army near Korea in 1895.

== Obsolescence ==
It is often said that the muzzle-loading Minié rifle became obsolete during the 1864 Second Schleswig War as the Danes foundered, equipped with Minié rifles, against the Prussians, who had the innovative early bolt-action Dreyse rifles, which had a superior rate of fire. Later, in the Austro-Prussian War, the Prussians again defeated their enemy in the form of the Austrians who were also equipped with Minié rifles. However, it is to be noted that, the Dreyse was an old design and had problems such as gas leakage which reduced its range, and during the same war, the Prussians had a much harder time against the Bavarian army, which used the superior range of their rifled-muskets to their advantage; the Austrians on the contrary embraced shock-tactics and relied on melee a lot, partially due to rifled-muskets training being very intensive and costly. As such, the obsolescence of the Minié type rifles at that time is debatable. In France, the existing Minié rifles were then retooled to accommodate a breech-loading mechanism reminiscent of a snuff box, and became known as Tabatière (snuff-box) rifles. Soon after, the breech-loading Chassepot system was adopted by the French army. The Chassepot was a much more perfected design and as such had both superior range and firing rate compared to a Minié type rifle, and it could be argued that it truly made Minié type rifles obsolete.

== Users ==
Mle. 1857 Minié rifle (Romanian Model 1861) manufactured at Tulle

- Argentina
- Belgium
- Bolivia
- Empire of Brazil – Imported from Belgium
- British Empire
- Confederate States of America
- Kingdom of Denmark
- Second French Empire
- Paraguay – Captured rifles during the Paraguayan War
- Peru
- Kingdom of Prussia
- Qing Empire – Imported from France
- Russian Empire
- Tokugawa shogunate
- United Principalities – adopted as the Model 1861 rifle
- United States
- Uruguay

== Gallery ==
The basic model used various types of rifled muskets

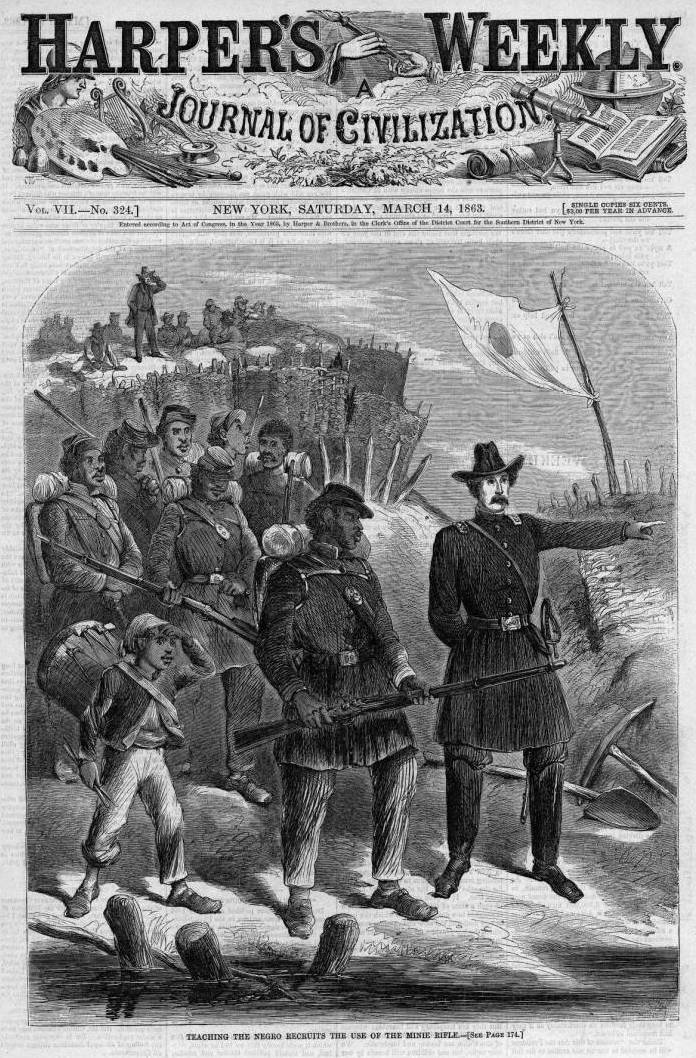
Training with the Minié rifle during the American Civil War, 1863. The caption reads: "Teaching the negro recruits the use of the Minié rifle"

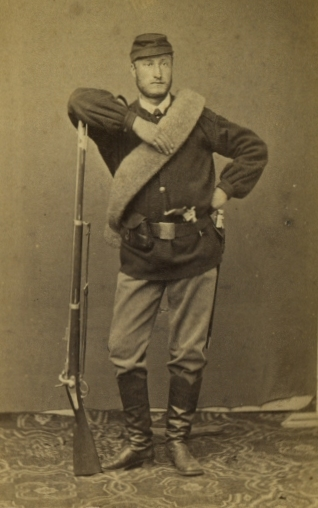
French soldier stands with M1842T Minié rifle

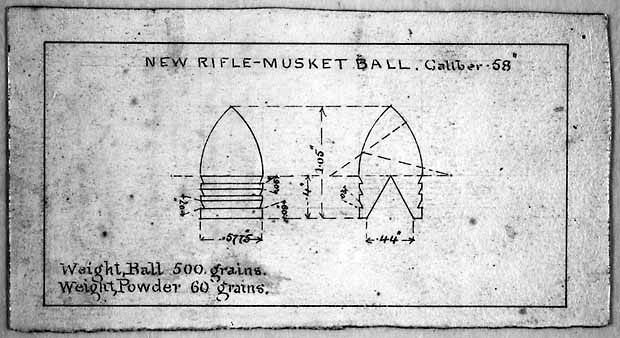
1855 Minié ball design from Harpers Ferry, West Virginia

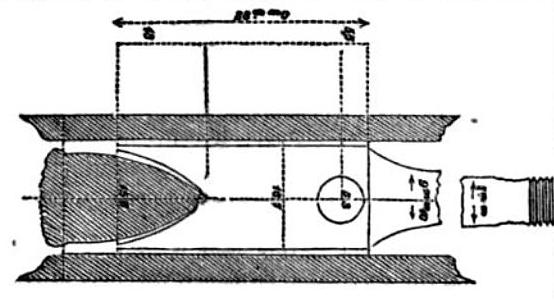
In the Minié rifle a countersunk ramrod was necessary to force the ball without damaging its shape

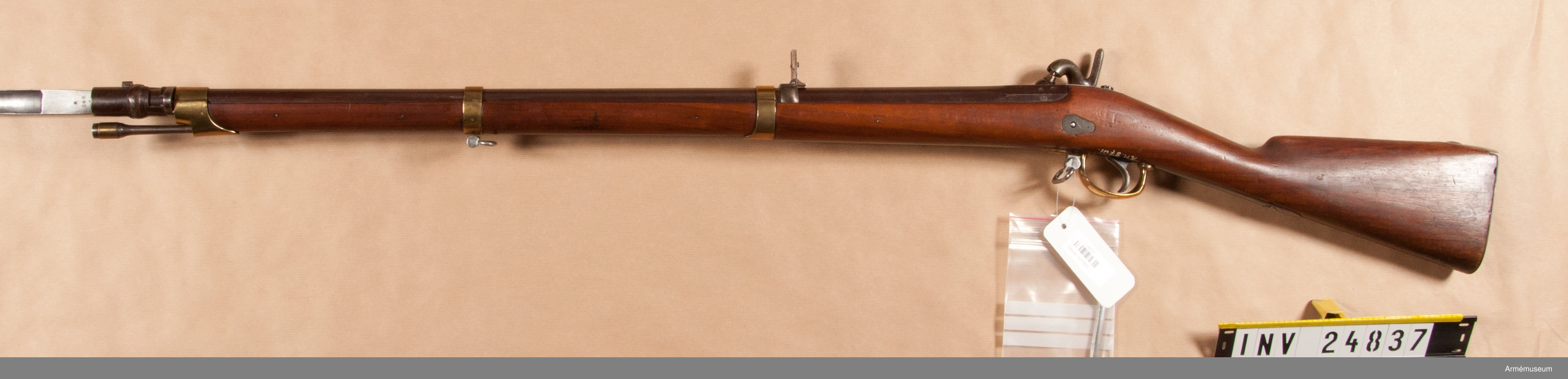
Minié copy purchased in 1855 from Belgium for Sweden

Preceded by Carabine à tige	French Army rifle 1857–1866	Succeeded by Tabatière rifle

== See also ==
- French weapons in the American Civil War
