= Gaspard Kollner =

Fifteenth-century gunsmith

Gaspard Kollner was a fifteenth- or sixteenth-century gunsmith based in Vienna. He is credited with having discovered that by rifling, that is, adding spiral grooves to the insides of the smoothbore muskets then in use, it was possible to make the gun not only shoot straighter but that its effective range would also increase.

Some authorities, however, point out that Kollner's barrels had straight, parallel grooves and that it was Augustus Kotter, of Nuremberg, who introduced the spiral-grooved barrels, in 1520.
