= Claude-Étienne Minié =

French Army officer and inventor (1804–1879)

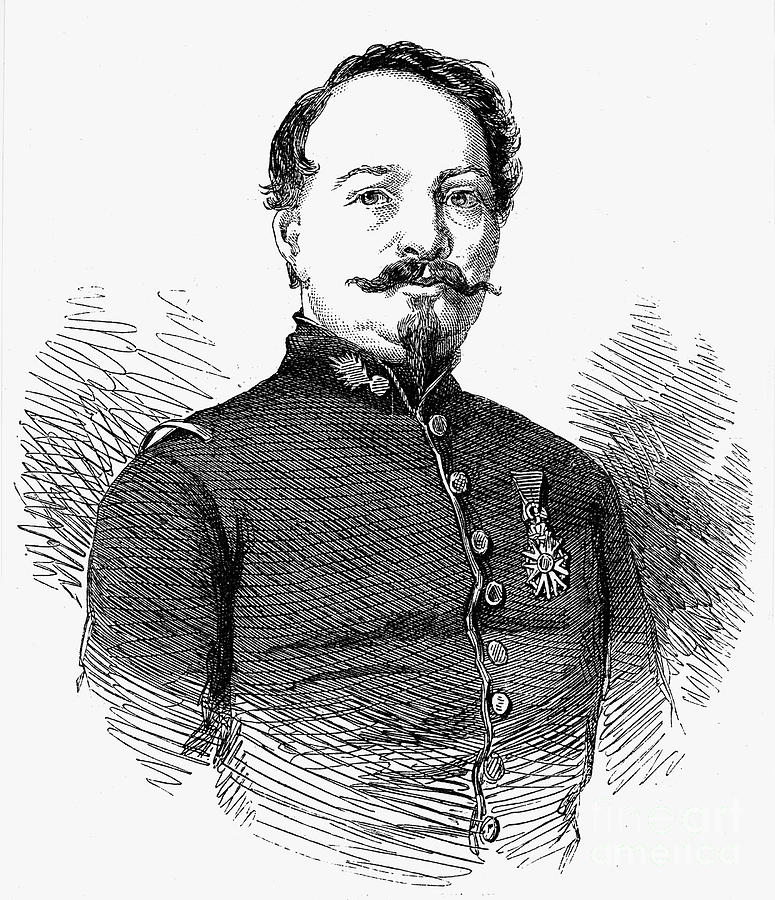
- Born: 13 February 1804; Paris, France
- Died: 14 December 1879 (aged 75); Paris, France
- Occupation: Army officer
- Known for: Designing a bullet for the muzzle-loading rifle

Claude-Etienne Minié (13 February 1804 – 14 December 1879) was a French military instructor and inventor famous for solving the problem of designing a reliable muzzle-loading rifle by inventing the Minié ball and Minié rifle in 1849. He succeeded the pioneering work of Henri-Gustave Delvigne and Louis-Étienne de Thouvenin.

Minié served in a number of African campaigns with the Chasseurs, after which he was eventually promoted to captain. In 1849 he designed the Minié ball, a cylindrical bullet with a conical hollow in the base which expanded when fired. This projectile, combined with his rifle, resulted in a major improvement in firearm accuracy.

The French government rewarded Minié with some 20,000 francs and installed him as a member of the staff at the Vincennes military school. In 1858, he retired from the French Army with the rank of colonel and later served as a military instructor for the khedive of Egypt and as a manager at the Remington Arms Company in the United States. His rifling technology proved critical to the increase in firearms accuracy seen during the American Civil War.

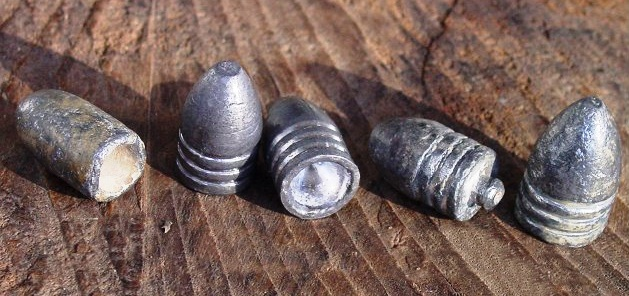
Minié balls

== Bibliography ==
- Sifakis, Stewart; "Minie, Claude Etienne", in Who was who in the Civil War. OCLC 73872151
- Rattenbury, Richard C., "Claude-Étienne Minié", Encyclopædia Britannica article.
