= Louis-Étienne de Thouvenin =

Former French army General (1791-1882)

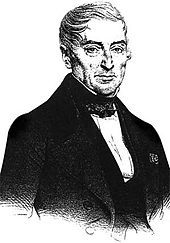
- Born: 1791; France
- Died: 1882 (aged 90–91); France
- Occupations: French Army general, inventor
- Known for: Inventor of carabine à tige

Louis-Étienne de Thouvenin (French: [lwi.etjɛn tuv(ə)nɛ̃]; 1791–1882) was a French Army general. He invented the carabine à tige (French for 'stem rifle' / 'pillar-breech rifle'), based on a method by which muzzle-loading rifles could be easily and effectively loaded.
