= Roan =

Roan may refer to:

== Animals ==
- Roan (color), a type of animal coat color that shows intermixed white and darker-colored hairs
- Roan (horse), a horse coat color pattern
- Varnish roan, a leopard-complex horse coat color that looks similar to roan
- Roan antelope, an African savanna antelope
- Roan Allen (1904–1930), one of the founding sires of the Tennessee Walking Horse

== People ==
- Roan (name), personal name and surname
- Chappell Roan (born 1998), American singer-songwriter
- Charles H. Roan (1923—1944), United States Marine
- Dan Roan (born 1976), sports editor for BBC News
- John Roan, landowner in Greenwich, London who left his estate for the founding of the John Roan School
- John Roan (bishop) (died 1692), Church of Ireland Bishop of Killaloe
- Michael Roan (born 1972), former professional American football tight end
- Oscar Roan (born 1951), former American football tight end
- Roan Carneiro (born 1978), Brazilian professional mixed martial artist
- Roan Ching-yueh (born 1958), Taiwanese architect, writer, curator and an Associate Professor of Department of Art Creativity

== Places ==
=== Iran ===
- Roan, Iran, a village in Hamadan Province

=== Norway ===
- Roan Municipality, a municipality in the Fosen district of Trøndelag county
- Roan (village), a village within Roan Municipality in Trøndelag county
- Roan Church, a church in Roan Municipality in Trøndelag county

=== United Kingdom ===
- Old Roan, an area in Aintree village, Merseyside, England
  - Old Roan railway station, a railway station in Aintree village, Merseyside, England
  - Old Roan Chase, a steeplechase in Aintree village, Merseyside, England
- Roan, County Tyrone, a townland in County Tyrone, Northern Ireland

=== United States ===
- Roan Cliffs, a range of mountains and cliffs in Utah and Colorado
- Roan Creek, a tributary of the Watauga River in Tennessee
- Roan Creek (Colorado), a tributary of the Colorado River in Garfield and Mesa counties, Colorado
- Roan Mountain (Roan Highlands), a mountain on the Tennessee-North Carolina border
- Roan Mountain, Tennessee, a census-designated place (CDP) in Carter County, Tennessee
- Roan Mountain State Park, located in East Tennessee along the Tennessee-North Carolina border
- Roan Plateau, a plateau that overlooks the Colorado River Valley

=== Zambia ===
- Roan (constituency), a parliamentary constituency in Luanshya District

== Other ==
- Battle of Roan's Tan Yard, an action during the American Civil War
- The John Roan School, a comprehensive secondary school in Blackheath, South-East London
- USS Charles H. Roan (DD-853) (1946–1973), a Gearing-class destroyer of the United States Navy
- Roan United F.C., a Zambian football club based in Luanshya
- The Secret of Roan Inish, 1994 American film

== See also ==
- Old Roan (disambiguation)
- Strawberry Roan (disambiguation)
- Roane, a surname
- Roanne, a commune in France
- Rohan (disambiguation)
