= Rowan (name) =

- Pronunciation: /ˈroʊən/
- Gender: Unisex
- Language: English; Irish (some variants); Arabic

Other names
- See also: Roan; Roy; Rohan

Rowan (/ˈroʊən/) is a traditionally masculine Irish given name and surname, now also in use as a given name for girls. Variants of the name include Roan, Rohan, Ruadhán, and Ruadh. The name comes from the Irish surname Ó Ruadháin and from the word ruadh, meaning "red-haired" or "rusty." When used as a feminine name, it is often in reference to the tree, the name of which has Scandinavian origins. It is also an Arabic feminine name (روان) referring to a river in Paradise. The name shares the same roots as the names Raya, Rana, Rania and Rayan.

Notable people with the name include:

== Surname ==
- Andrew Summers Rowan (1857–1943), American army officer
- Archibald Hamilton Rowan (1751–1834), Irish celebrity and founding member of The Dublin Society of United Irishmen
- Athol Rowan (1921–1998), South African cricketer
- Barbara Ann Rowan (1938–2020), American attorney
- Carl Rowan (1925–2000), American journalist and author
- Chad Rowan (1969–2024), Akebono, Hawaiian sumo wrestler
- Sir Charles Rowan (c. 1782 – 1852), officer in the British Army and Commissioner of Police of the (London) Metropolis
- Dan Rowan (1922–1987), American actor and comedian, Rowan & Martin's Laugh-In
- Dave Rowan (1882–1955), Canadian baseball player
- Dawn Rowan (born 1946), Australian therapist
- Dominic Rowan (born 1970), English actor
- Ellis Rowan (1847–1922), Australian naturalist and illustrator
- Eric Rowan (1909–1993), South African cricketer
- Erick Rowan (born 1981), ring name of American wrestler Joseph Rudd
- Ev Rowan (1902–1956), American football player
- Ford Rowan, American television reporter, and panelist on Meet the Press
- George Rowan, Scottish footballer
- Henry Rowan (1923–2015), American philanthropist and engineer, namesake of Rowan University
- Jenny Rowan (born 1949), New Zealand politician
- John Rowan (disambiguation), several people
- Jonathan Rowan (born 1981), English footballer
- Joseph Rowan (1870–1930), American politician from New York
- Kelly Rowan (born 1965), Canadian actress and model
- Leslie Rowan (1908–1972), British civil servant and industrialist
- Levi J. Rowan (1871–1934) American academic administrator, college president, teacher, and photographer
- Lou Rowan (1925–2017), Australian cricket umpire
- Louis R. Rowan (1911–1988), American businessman and racehorse owner and breeder
- Matthew Rowan (died 1769), American politician from North Carolina
- Peter Rowan (born 1942), American bluegrass musician and composer
- Ron Rowan (born 1962), American basketball player
- Sheila Rowan (physicist) (born 1969), British physicist
- Stephen Clegg Rowan (1808–1890), American vice admiral
- William Rowan (1789–1879), British military commander
- Rowan Brok (born 2008) up and coming John Deere technician, diesel technology LATC

== Given name ==
- Saint Rowan, Irish 6th century abbot, one of the Apostles of Ireland
- Rowan Alexander, Scottish football player and manager
- Rowan Atkinson (born 1955), English actor, comedian, and screenwriter
- Rowan Barrett (born 1972), Canadian basketball player
- Rowan Bettjeman, New Zealander YouTuber, actor, director, and producer
- Rowan Blanchard (born 2001), American actress
- Rowan Bowles, Australian handbike cyclist
- Rowan Hisayo Buchanan (born 1989), American writer
- Rowan Cronjé (1937–2014), Rhodesian politician
- Rowan Crothers (born 1997), Australian swimmer
- Rowan Deacon, English director and filmmaker
- Rowan Ellis, British YouTuber and author
- Rowan Gomes (1962–2023), Antiguan basketball player
- Rowan Pelling (born 1968), British editor and columnist
- Rowan Rheingans, English folk musician, songwriter and vocalist
- Rowan Vine (born 1982), English footballer
- Rowan Williams (born 1950), Archbishop of Canterbury
- Rowan Woods, Australian film director
- William Rowan Hamilton (1805–1865), Irish mathematician

== Fictional characters ==
- Rowan, one of the two main protagonists in Fire Emblem Warriors
- Rowan, the main character in Emily Rodda's Rowan of Rin fantasy books
- Rowan Berry, played by Siobhan Thompson in The Unsleeping City, the third season of Dimension 20.
- Rowan Damisch, one of the two main characters in the novel Scythe
- Rowan Khanna, in the mobile game Harry Potter: Hogwarts Mystery
- Rowan LaFontaine, in the film Jason X
- Rowan Mayfair, in the Lives of the Mayfair Witches trilogy by Anne Rice
- Rowan Mills, in NBC's The Blacklist
- Rowan Morrison, in 1973 film The Wicker Man
- Rowan North, the main antagonist of the 2016 Ghostbusters reboot
- Rowan Omondi, a main character in Alice Oseman's I Was Born for This
- Rowan Theirin (née Guerrin), in Dragon Age: The Stolen Throne by David Gaider
- Rowan Whitethorn, in the Throne of Glass book series by Sarah J. Maas
- Professor Rowan, in the Pokémon franchise
- Lily Rowan, in the Nero Wolfe franchise by Rex Stout
- Rosalie Rowan, in the DC Animated Universe
- Rowan Segmunt, in the Re:Zero light novel series
- Rowan Kenrith, in the Magic: The Gathering multiverse

== See also ==
- Rawan (disambiguation)
- Rowen (disambiguation)
