= Rohan =

Rohan may refer to:

== People and characters ==
- Duke of Rohan
- The House of Rohan, a family of French nobility from Morbihan
- Rohan (name), includes a list of people and fictional characters with the given name or surname Rohan

== Places ==
=== France ===
- Château des Rohan (Mutzig), France
- Palais Rohan, Bordeaux, France
- Palais Rohan, Strasbourg, France
- Rohan, Morbihan, a French commune in Brittany
- Rohan Castle, in Saverne, France

=== Other countries ===
- Fort Rohan, a fort in Malta, also known as Fort San Lucian
- Rohan, Kharkiv Oblast, an urban-type settlement in Kharkiv Oblast
- Żebbuġ, Malta, also known as Città Rohan
  - De Rohan Arch, a commemorative arch in Żebbuġ

== Other uses ==
- Rohan (clothing), a clothing company
- Rohan, Middle-earth, a realm in J. R. R. Tolkien's Middle-earth
- Rohan: Blood Feud, an online computer game
- Rohan Hours, an illuminated manuscript

== See also ==
- Mount Rohana, another name for Adam's Peak, a mountain in Sri Lanka
- Roan (disambiguation)
- Roanne
