= Chassepot =

French needle gun

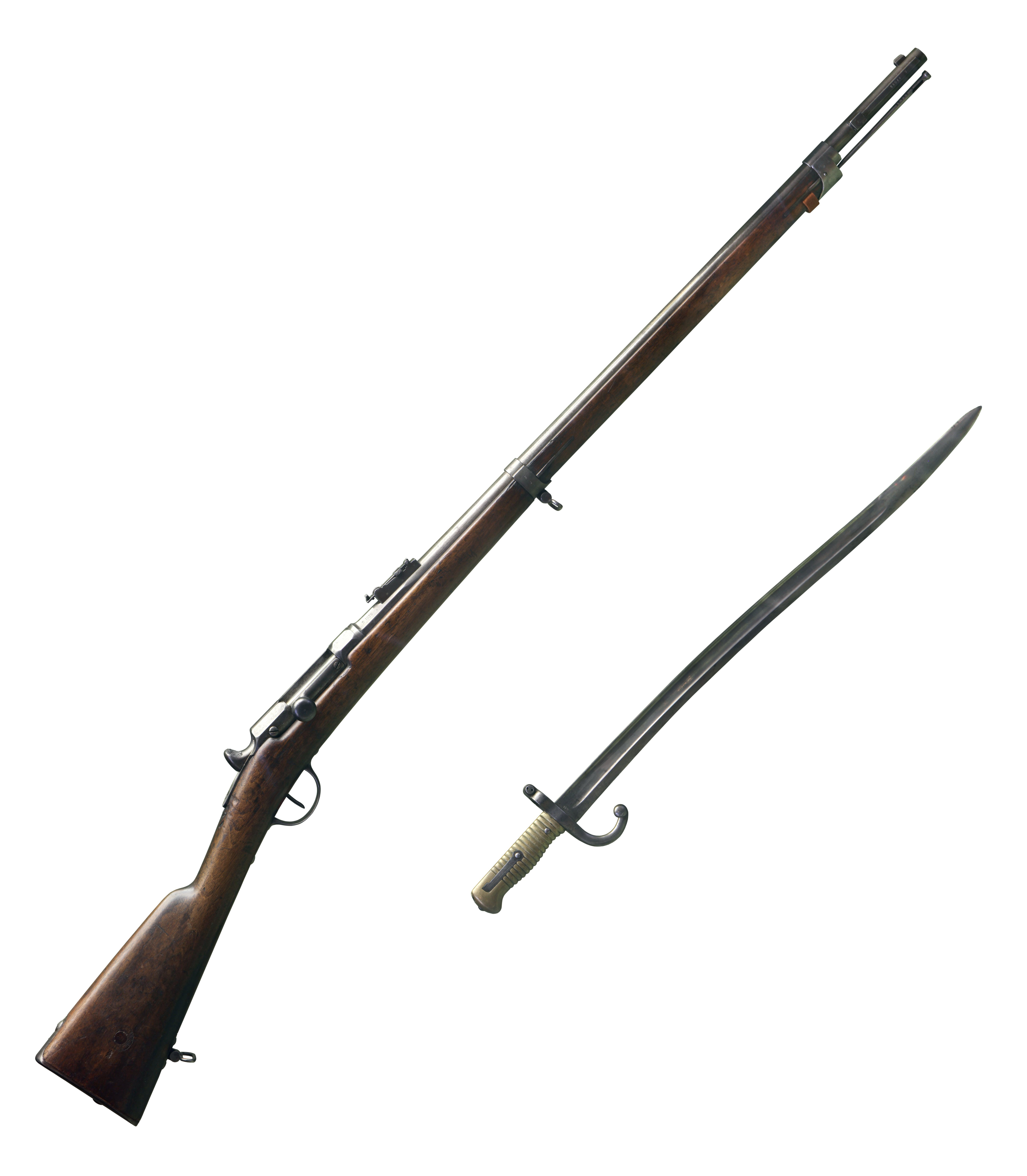
- Chassepot rifle with bayonet
- Type: Needle gun
- Place of origin: France

Service history
- In service: 1866–1874 (primary French service rifle)
- Used by: See Users
- Wars: Italian Wars of Unification; Franco-Prussian War; French colonial conflicts; Russo-Turkish War; War of the Pacific; Boshin War; Revolution of 1880; Federalist Revolution; First Italo-Ethiopian War; Revolutions of 1917–1923; Rio Grande do Sul Revolt of 1924; Other conflicts

Production history
- Designer: Antoine Alphonse Chassepot
- Designed: 1858–1866
- Produced: 1866–1875
- No. built: ~2,000,000

Specifications
- Mass: 4.635 kilograms (10 lb 3.5 oz)
- Length: 1.31 m (4 ft 4 in) without bayonet; 1.88 m (6 ft 2 in) with bayonet
- Barrel length: 795 mm (31.3 in)
- Cartridge: Lead bullet 25 g (386 gr) in paper cartridge; Charge 5.6 g (86.4 gr) black powder
- Caliber: 11 mm (.433 inches)
- Action: Bolt action
- Rate of fire: 8–15 rounds per minute
- Muzzle velocity: 410 m/s (1,300 ft/s)
- Maximum firing range: 1,200 m (1,300 yd) service rifle; 1,600 m (1,700 yd) fusil pour la cavalerie d'Afrique model
- Feed system: Single-shot breach loading
- Sights: Ladder

The Chassepot (pronounced /ˈʃæspoʊ/ SHAS-poh; French pronunciation: [ʃas.po]), officially known as the Fusil modèle 1866, was a bolt-action military breechloading rifle. It is famous for having been the weapon of the French forces in the Franco-Prussian War of 1870–1871. It replaced an assortment of muzzleloading Minié rifles, many of which were converted in 1864 to breech loading (the Tabatière rifles). An improvement on existing military rifles in 1866, the Chassepot marked the commencement of the era of modern bolt-action, breech-loading military rifles. The fusil Gras modèle 1874 was an officially adopted successor to the Chassepot. Although based on and frequently converted from existing Chassepot rifles, it was designated as a new model and adopted as a separate rifle firing a metallic cartridge.

It was manufactured by Manufacture d'armes de Saint-Étienne (MAS), Manufacture d'armes de Châtellerault (MAC), Manufacture d'armes de Tulle (MAT), and, until 1870, in the Manufacture d'armes de Mutzig in the former Château des Rohan. Many were also manufactured under contract in England (the "Potts et Hunts" Chassepots delivered to the French Navy), in Belgium (Liege), and in Italy at Brescia (by Glisenti). The approximate number of Chassepot rifles available to the French Army in July 1870 was 1,037,555 units. Additionally, state manufacturies could deliver 30,000 new rifles monthly. Gun manufacturers in Britain and Austria also produced Chassepot rifles to support the French war effort. The Josef und Franz Werndl & Co. in Steyr, Austria delivered 12,000 Chassepot carbines and 100,000 parts to France in 1871. Manufacturing of the Chassepot rifle ended in February 1875, four years after the end of the Franco-Prussian War, with approximately 700,000 more Chassepot rifles made between September 1871 and July 1874.

== History ==
The Chassepot was named after its inventor, Antoine Alphonse Chassepot (1833–1905), who, from the mid-1850s onwards, had constructed various experimental forms of breech loaders. The first two models of the Chassepot still used percussion cap ignition. The third model, using a similar system to the Prussian Dreyse needle gun, became the French service weapon on 30 August 1866. In the following year it made its first appearance at the Battle of Mentana on 3 November 1867, where it inflicted severe losses upon Giuseppe Garibaldi's troops. It was reported to the French Parliament that "Les Chassepots ont fait merveille!", ("The Chassepots have done wonderfully!") The heavy cylindrical lead bullets fired at high velocity by the Chassepot rifle inflicted wounds that were even worse than those of the Minié rifle. By 1868, the entire French active army had been re-armed with the Chassepot.

In the Franco-Prussian War (1870–1871), the Chassepot met its Prussian counterpart, the Dreyse needle-fire rifle. The Chassepot had several advantages over the Dreyse. It featured a rubber obturator on its bolt head to provide a more efficient gas seal. Although it fired a smaller caliber (11 mm vs. 15.4 for the Dreyse), the Chassepot ammunition had more gunpowder (5.68 grams vs 4.85 grams), resulting in higher muzzle velocity (436 meters per second, 33% over the Dreyse), a flatter trajectory and a longer range. Thus the sights on the Chassepot could be elevated up to 1,600 meters, while the maximum sight setting of the Dreyse was only 600 meters. The Chassepot had a weight of 4.1 kg versus 4.57 kg for the needle-fire rifle. It was also shorter (1310 mm vs. 1424 mm).

After the war, 20,000 captured Chassepot rifles were sold to the Shah of the Persian Qajar dynasty. The Tokugawa shogunate placed an order for 40,000 rifles in May 1867, but only 3,000 were delivered by the French military mission before the start of the Boshin War. Production of the Chassepot was discontinued in 1875 in favor of the Gras rifle and several were converted to accept the 11×59mmR Gras metallic cartridge afterwards, though the French Navy kept unmodified Chassepots in service until they were replaced by the Kropatschek rifle in 1878.

In 1872 the Empire of Brazil purchased 8,631 Chassepots; after being faced with a possible war involving Argentine claims over Paraguay. The weapons, however, were never officially distributed to the Army, since the decision to buy the Comblain had already been made and because of issue with the cartridge's reliability. The weapons ended their career in deposit or were handed over to police forces and shooting clubs. Some of these weapons were possibly used by rebels during the War of Canudos, they may have been captured from the Bahia police after the engagement at Maceté. Chassepots were used during the Federalist Revolution and by the tenentist rebels of the 1924 revolt in Rio Grande do Sul.

In June 1880, some 40 1866 Chassepots with a few bayonets were delivered to the port of Buenos Aires. Those Chassepots were of 11mm calibre and were possibly rechambered for the Gras cartridge (They were delivered together with Gras rifles in a shipment of 450 weapons).

Surplus Chassepot were exported to China. Some of the warriors of the Ethiopian Empire were equipped with Chassepot rifles during the first Italo-Ethiopian War of 1896.

== Technology ==
=== Bolt mechanism ===
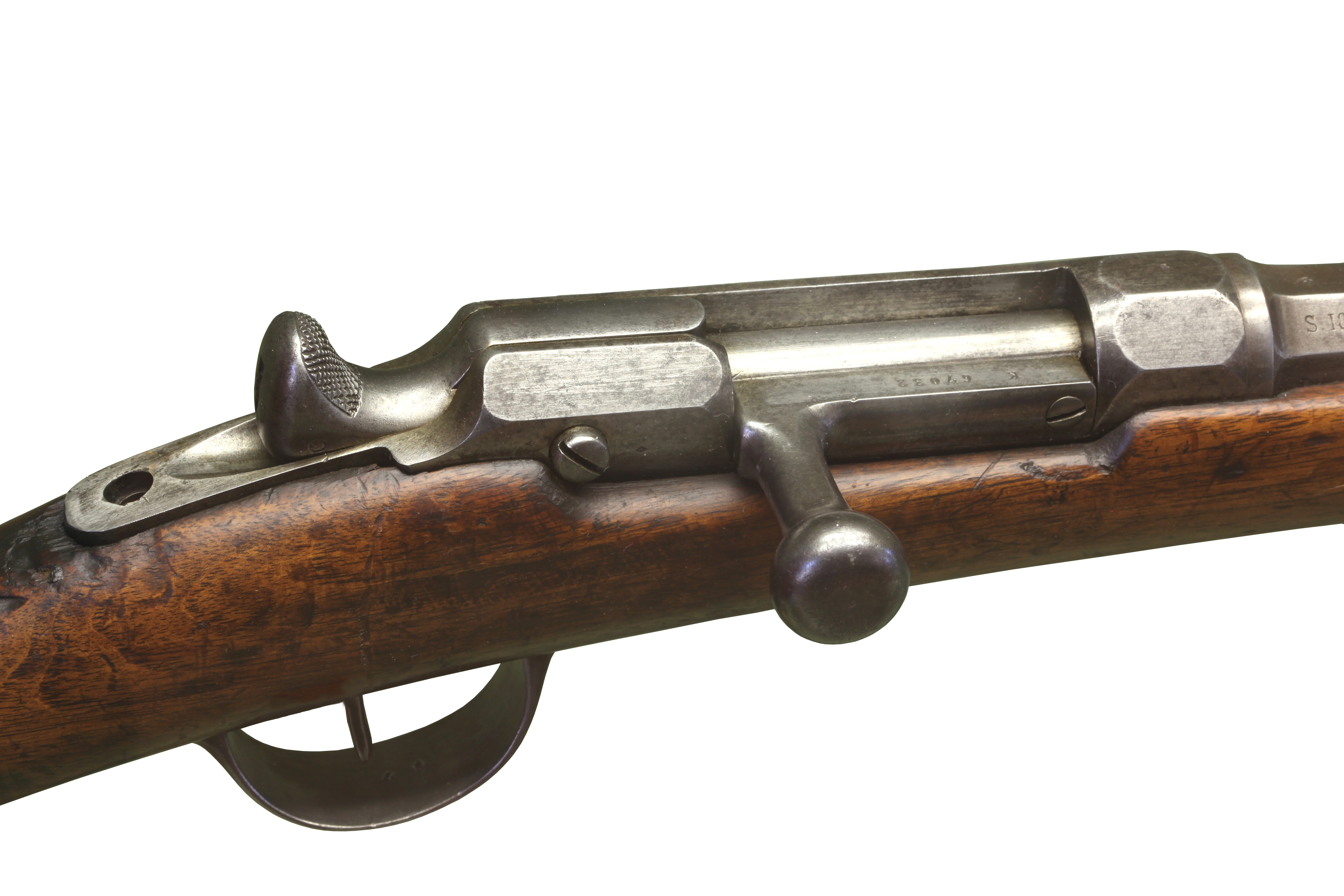
Chassepot bolt mechanism

The breech was closed by a bolt similar to those of more modern rifles. Amongst the technical features of interest introduced in 1866 on the Chassepot rifle was the method of obturation of the bolt by a segmented rubber ring which expanded under gas pressure and thus sealed the breech when the shot was fired. This simple yet effective technology was successfully adapted to artillery in 1877 by Colonel de Bange, who invented grease-impregnated asbestos pads to seal the breech of his new cannons (the De Bange system).

=== Cartridge ===
The Chassepot used a paper cartridge that many refer to as 'combustible', although in reality it was quite the opposite. It held an 11 mm (0.433 in) round-headed cylindro-conoidal lead bullet that was wax paper patched. An inverted standard percussion cap was at the rear of the paper cartridge and hidden inside. The cartridge was filled with 5.6 grams of black powder. It was fired by the Chassepot's needle (a sharply pointed firing pin) upon pressing the trigger. While the Chassepot's ballistic performance and firing rates were excellent for the time, burnt paper residues as well as black powder fouling accumulated in the chamber and bolt mechanism after continuous firing. The bolt's rubber obturator eroded in action but was easily replaced in the field by infantrymen. The older Dreyse needle gun and its cartridge had been designed to minimize those problems but to the detriment of its ballistic properties.

To correct this problem the Chassepot was replaced in 1874 by the Gras rifle which used a centerfire drawn brass metallic cartridge. Otherwise, the Gras rifle was basically identical in outward appearance to the Chassepot rifle. Nearly all rifles of the older Chassepot model (Mle 1866) remaining in store were eventually converted to take the 11 mm Gras metallic cartridge ammunition (fusil Modèle 1866/74). About 665,327 Chassepot rifles had been captured by the German coalition that defeated France in 1871. Large numbers of these captured Chassepot rifles were shortened and converted to 11 mm Mauser metallic cartridge. Including 55,000 converted by Steyr that served with cavalry units of the Kingdom of Saxony and of the Kingdom of Bavaria. Other 11 mm Mauser conversions were carried out by Kynoch in Birmingham between 1885 and 1889. In most but not all, the French receiver markings on these German-captured Chassepot rifles had been erased.

== Users ==
- Second French Empire
- Monaco
- Papal States
- Beylik of Tunis
- Kingdom of Bavaria
- Kingdom of Saxony
- Brazil – limited
- Peru
- Bolivia
- Kingdom of Dahomey
- Qajar Iran
- Qing Dynasty
- Bulgaria – 20,000 issued to Volunteers in the Russo-Turkish War.
- Kingdom of Greece – Used in the Greco-Turkish War (1897)
- Ethiopian Empire
- Principality of Serbia
- Tokugawa Shogunate – 40,000 rifles were ordered but only 3,000 were delivered prior to the Boshin War.
- Nguyễn dynasty
- Wassoulou Empire

== Gallery ==
Chassepot rifle 1866 technical drawing - Barrel

Chassepot rifle 1866 technical drawing - Trigger mechanism

Chassepot rifle 1866 technical drawing - Bolt assembly

Chassepot rifle 1866 technical drawing - Cocking piece

Chassepot rifle 1866 technical drawing - Trigger guard

Chassepot rifle 1866 technical drawing - Barrel band and sling swivel

Chassepot rifle 1866 technical drawing - Front barrel band

Chassepot rifle 1866 technical drawing - Butt plate and retaining springs

Chassepot rifle 1866 technical drawing - Rear sling swivel

Chassepot rifle 1866 technical drawing - Screws and fasteners

Chassepot rifle 1866 technical drawing - Wooden stock

chassepot rifle 1866 technical drawing - Iron sights second pattern

chassepot rifle 1866 technical drawing - Accessories and tools

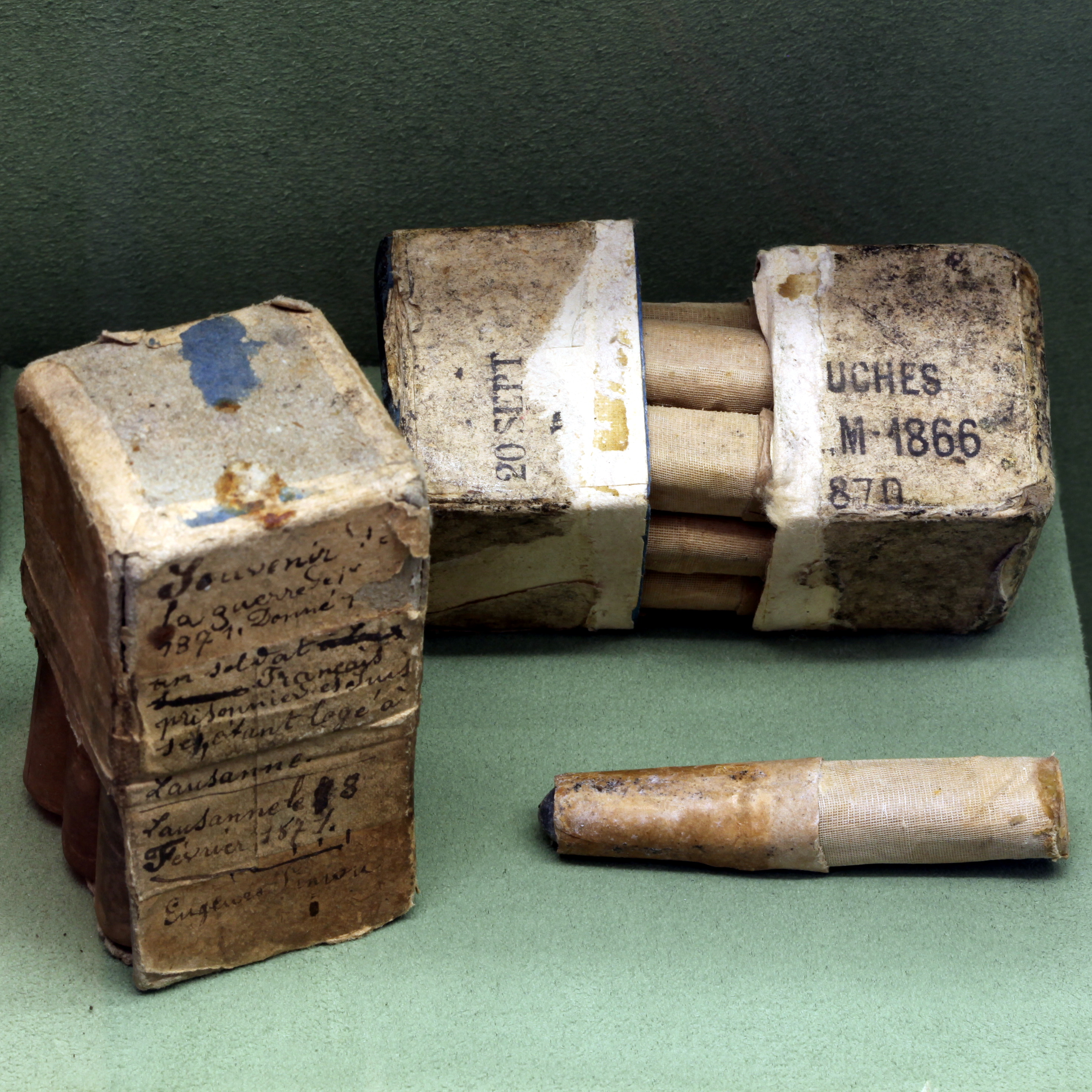
Chassepot paper cartridge and boxes.

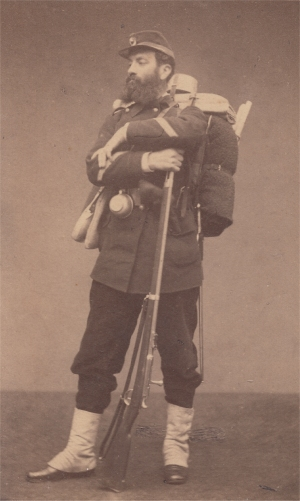
French soldier with Chassepot rifle.

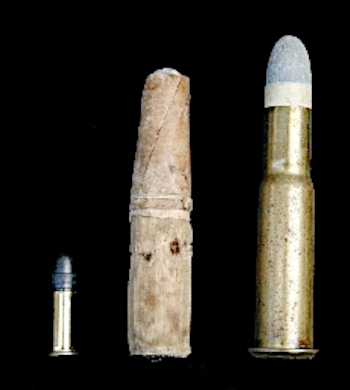
From left: .22 Long Rifle;
11mm paper cartridge for Chassepot/Fusil modèle 1866;
11mm×59.5R metallic cartridge for Fusil Gras mle 1874

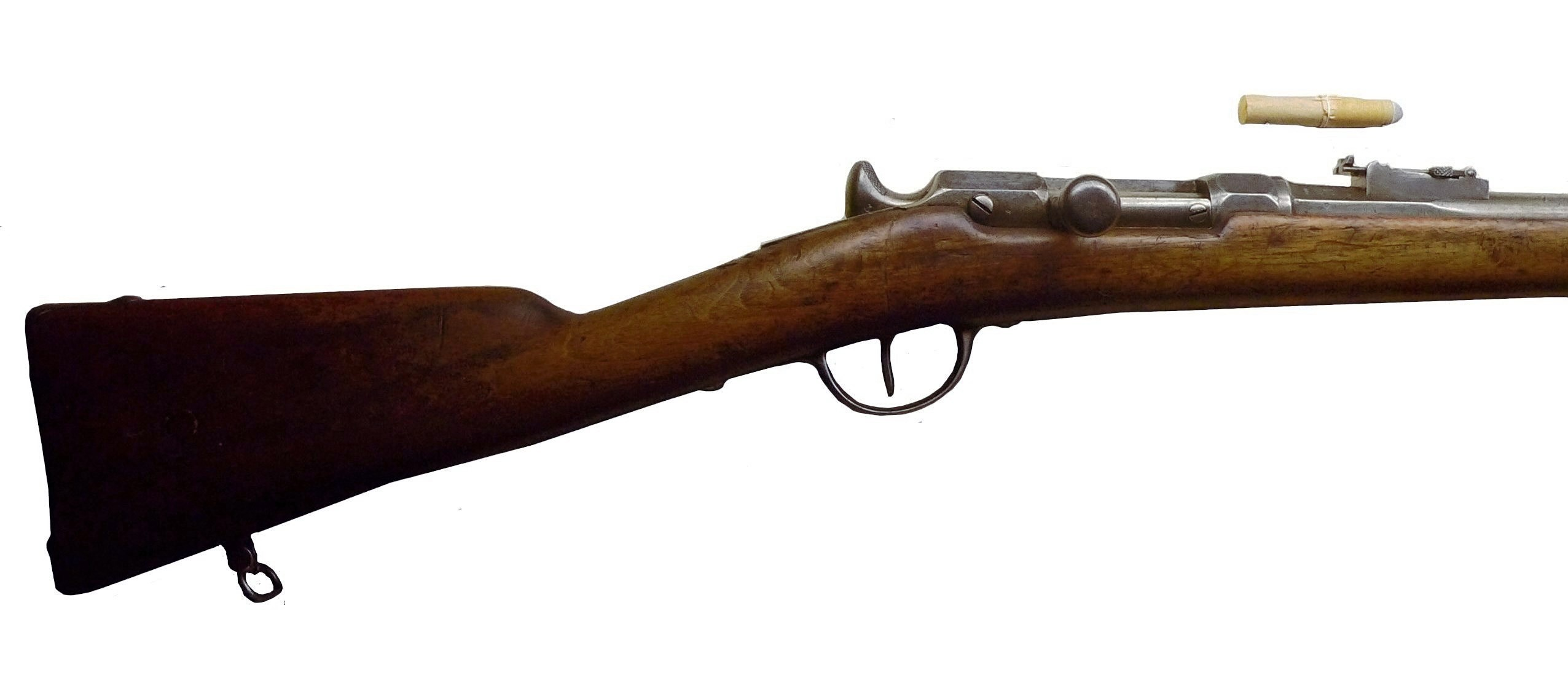
Close-up, with cartridge

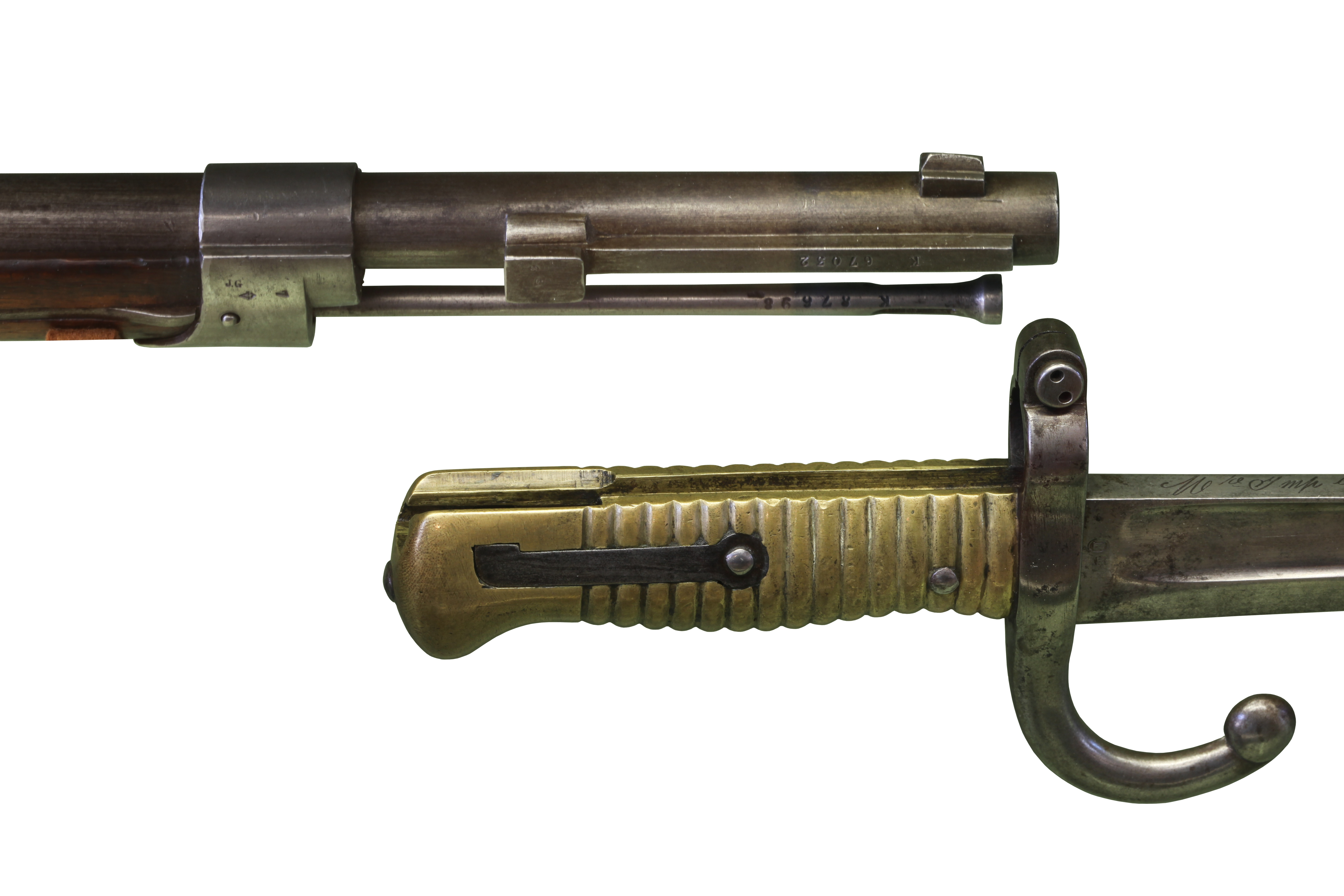
Bayonet assembly

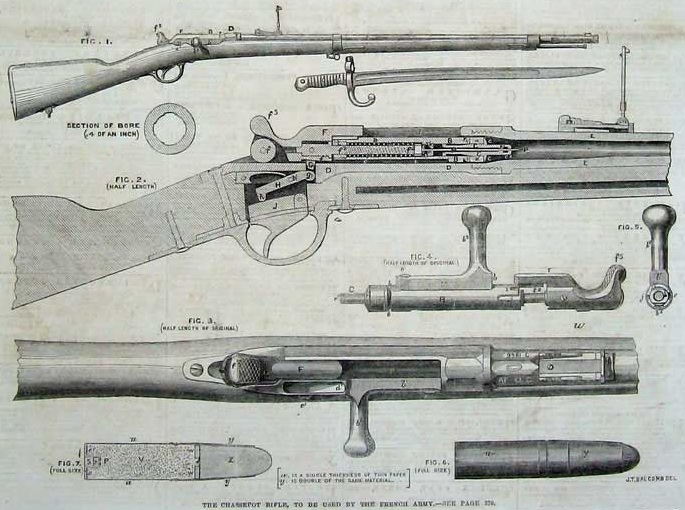
1867 newspaper illustration including a cross-section

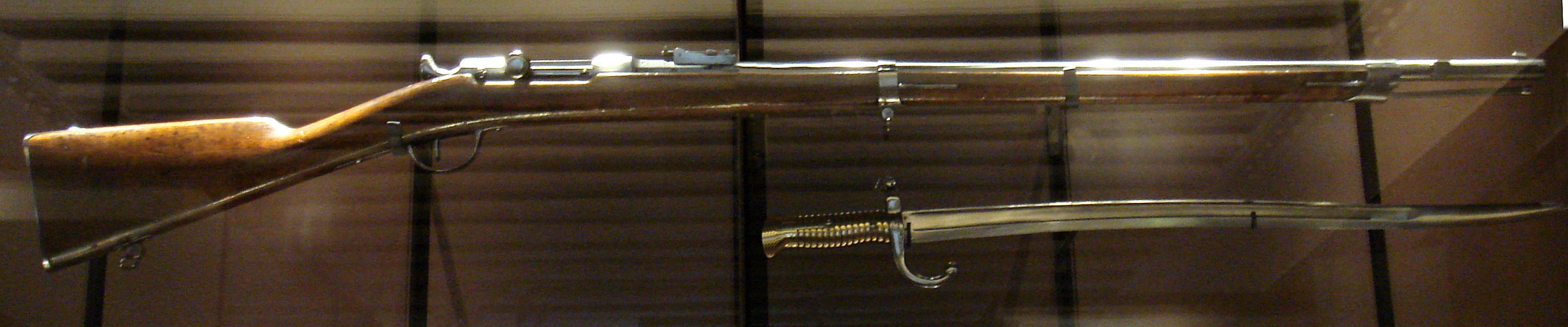
Chassepot gun, model 1866, Mutzig, 1869.

== See also ==
- Antique gun
- Service rifle

== Notes ==
| Preceded by Tabatière rifle | French Army rifle 1866–1874 | Succeeded by Fusil Gras Modèle 1874 |
