= Moses Munius =

Personal life
- Born: 1760 Mutzig, Kingdom of France
- Died: May 1842 (aged 81–82) Rixheim, Kingdom of France

Religious life
- Religion: Judaism

Moses ben Seligmann Munius (French: Moïse ben Seligmann Munius; 1760 – May 1842) was a French rabbi from Mutzig.

== Biography ==
Moses Munius was born in Mutzig in 1760, reputedly descended from Löwe ben Bezaleel. After completing his studies at the renowned yeshiva in Prague, he was appointed head of a Talmudic school in Strasbourg, where he remained for two decades.

Munius later returned in Mutzig, holding the position of syndic. When the community's rabbi, Simon Cohen, was apprehended under the orders of Eulogius Schneider of the Revolutionary Tribunal, Munius interceded on behalf of the rabbi. Schneider agreed to secure Cohen's release, but this promise went unfulfilled as Schneider himself was arrested and taken to Paris in 1794, where he was condemned to death.

Following these events, Munius assumed the role of rabbi in Rixheim, where he remained until his death in 1842. He left behind a collection of manuscript works that attested to his profound expertise in Talmudic studies, including commentaries to Pirkei Avot and the Haftarot, sermons, and responsa.
