= Roan (name) =

- Gender: Male
- Language: Frisian, English (rare)

Origin
- Meaning: raven

Other names
- See also: Rowan

Roan is a Frisian given name. It is sometimes used also in other languages such as English, where it can be also an alternate form of Rowan. It can be also a surname. Variants of the name include Ronne. It comes from Proto-Germanic *hrabanaz (Old High German hraban) meaning "raven".

== Given name ==
- Roan Brennan, British para swimmer
- Roan Carneiro (born 1978), Brazilian mixed martial artist
- Roan Frostwick (born 2000), Scottish rugby union player
- Roan Johnson (born 1975), Italian director and screenwriter
- Roan Nogha (born 2004), Cameroonian footballer
- Roan Parrish, American writer
- Roan van de Moosdijk (born 2000), Dutch motorcycle racer
- Roan Wilson (born 2002), Costa Rican footballer

== Surname ==
- Chappell Roan, American singer-songwriter
- Charles H. Roan (1923–1944), United States Marine and Medal of Honor recipient
- Dan Roan (born 1976), British sports journalist
- John Roan (c. 1600/1602–1644), English landowner
  - The John Roan School, London, England
- John Roan (bishop) (d. 1692), Church of Ireland bishop
- Paul Roan (born 1943), American politician

== Fictional ==
- Roan Fel, a fictional character in the Star Wars expanded universe
- Roan, a character from Grandia II
- Roan, a character from The 100, the Azgedian King

== See also ==
- Roan Allen (1904–1930), one of the founding sires of the Tennessee Walking Horse
- Roan Ching-yueh (born 1957), Taiwanese architect, writer and professor
