= Antoine Alphonse Chassepot =

French inventor

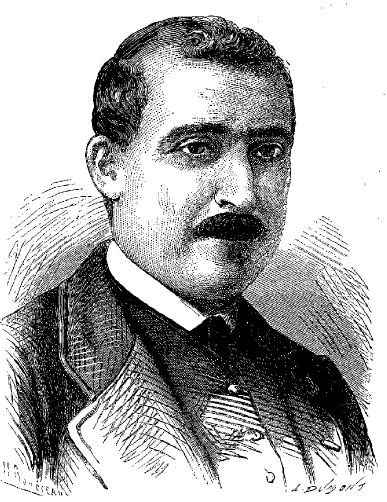
- Antoine Alphonse Chassepot
- Born: Antoine Alphonse Chassepot; March 4, 1833; Mutzig, France
- Died: February 5, 1905 (aged 71); Gagny
- Occupation: inventor

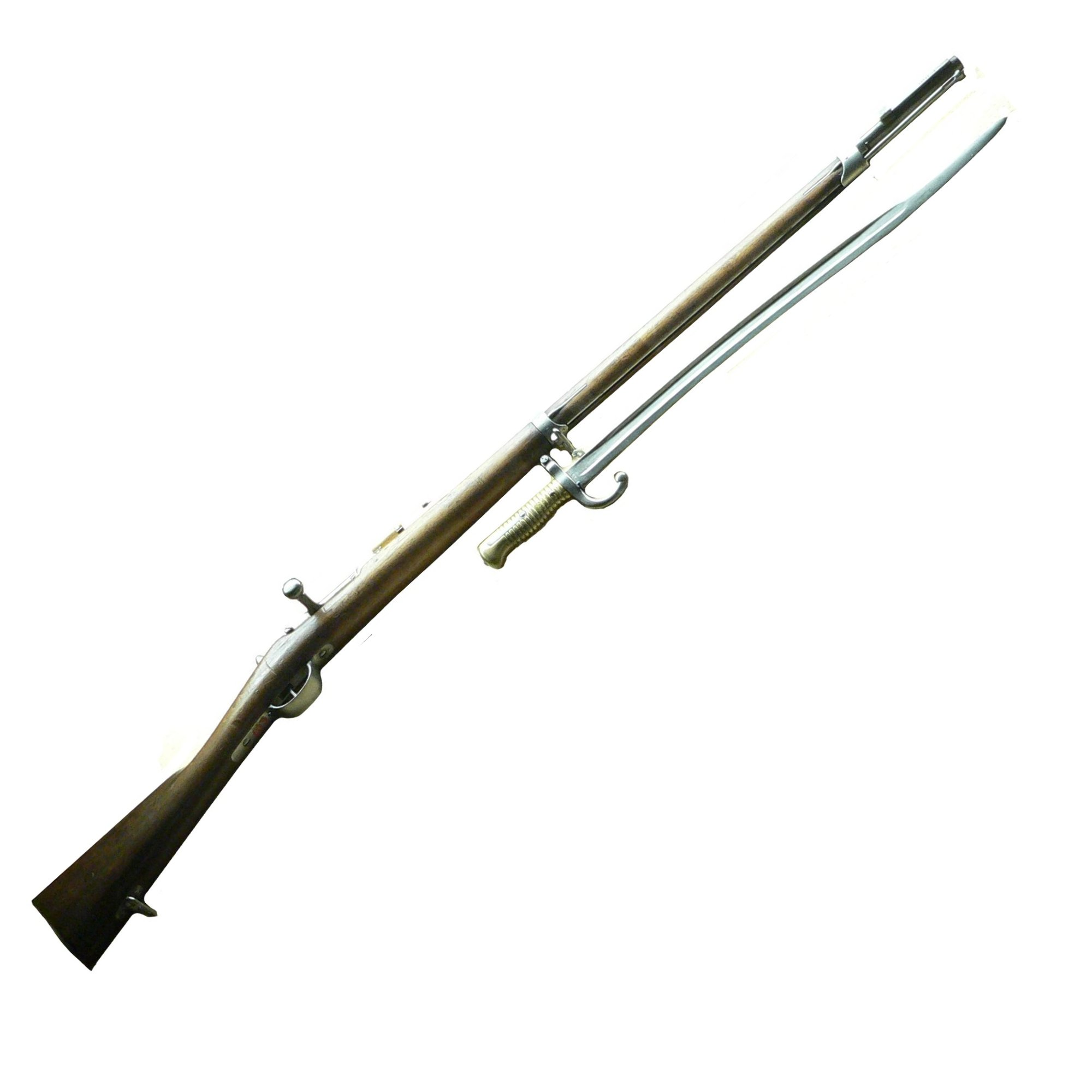
A Chassepot.

Antoine Alphonse Chassepot (French: [ɑ̃twan alfɔ̃s ʃaspo]; 1833–1905) was a French inventor and gunsmith. Born in 1833 in the town of Mutzig in Alsace, he is best known for inventing the breech-loading, center-fire needle gun rifle named after him: the Chassepot. Officially known as the Fusil modèle 1866, the rifle was adopted by the French army in 1866, for which Chassepot received the Cross of the Légion d'honneur and a gratuity of 30,000 francs.
