= Roane =

Roane is a surname. Notable people with the surname include:

- Anthony Roane (died 1583), English politician
- Archibald Roane (1769–1819), 2nd Governor of Tennessee
- John Roane (1766–1838), American politician
- John Roane (1794–1869), American politician
- John Roane (1817–1867), 4th Governor of Arkansas
- Spencer Roane (1762–1822), American jurist
- William Roane (1787–1845), American politician

== See also ==
- Roane County (disambiguation)
- Justice Roane (disambiguation)
