= Fort de Mutzig =

Fortification in Bas-Rhin, France

- Part of German fortifications of Strasbourg
- France
- Location of the Fort de Mutzig and the fortified belt of Strasbourg, which together formed the German defense line on the Bruche, also known as Breuschstellung.

Site information
- Type: Fort
- Controlled by: Germany
- Open to the public: Yes, not in totality

Location
- The Fort de Mutzig location in France
- Coordinates: 48.547778°N 7.461389°E

Site history
- Built: 1893
- Materials: Concrete, steel

Garrison information
- Current commander: French army
- Garrison: 6500

The Fort de Mutzig, also known as Feste Kaiser Wilhelm II, is located near the town of Mutzig, in the Bas-Rhin department of France. It is one of the fortifications built by Germany at the end of the 19th century to defend Strasbourg.

It was the first new fortification built in what was then German territory after the invention of high explosives, which rendered earlier masonry fortifications obsolete.

== Concept ==
Fort de Mutzig was part of a network of forts surrounding Strasbourg and Metz that had been built by the Germans after the end of the Franco-Prussian War. Earlier forts built from 1872 to 1880 used masonry, which did not resist high explosives, or concrete. The Mutzig works were planned as a demonstration of new technology.

The western fort, built in 1895, was built of concrete from the beginning, while the 1893 eastern fort, which had been built in masonry, was reinforced and covered in concrete. Armored observation points and 150mm howitzer turrets were installed, while Mutzig was the first German fort with its own electricity generating plant. It also was equipped with a radio link to Strasbourg, infantry shelters and underground living quarters. Costs were estimated at 15 million marks.

== Description ==
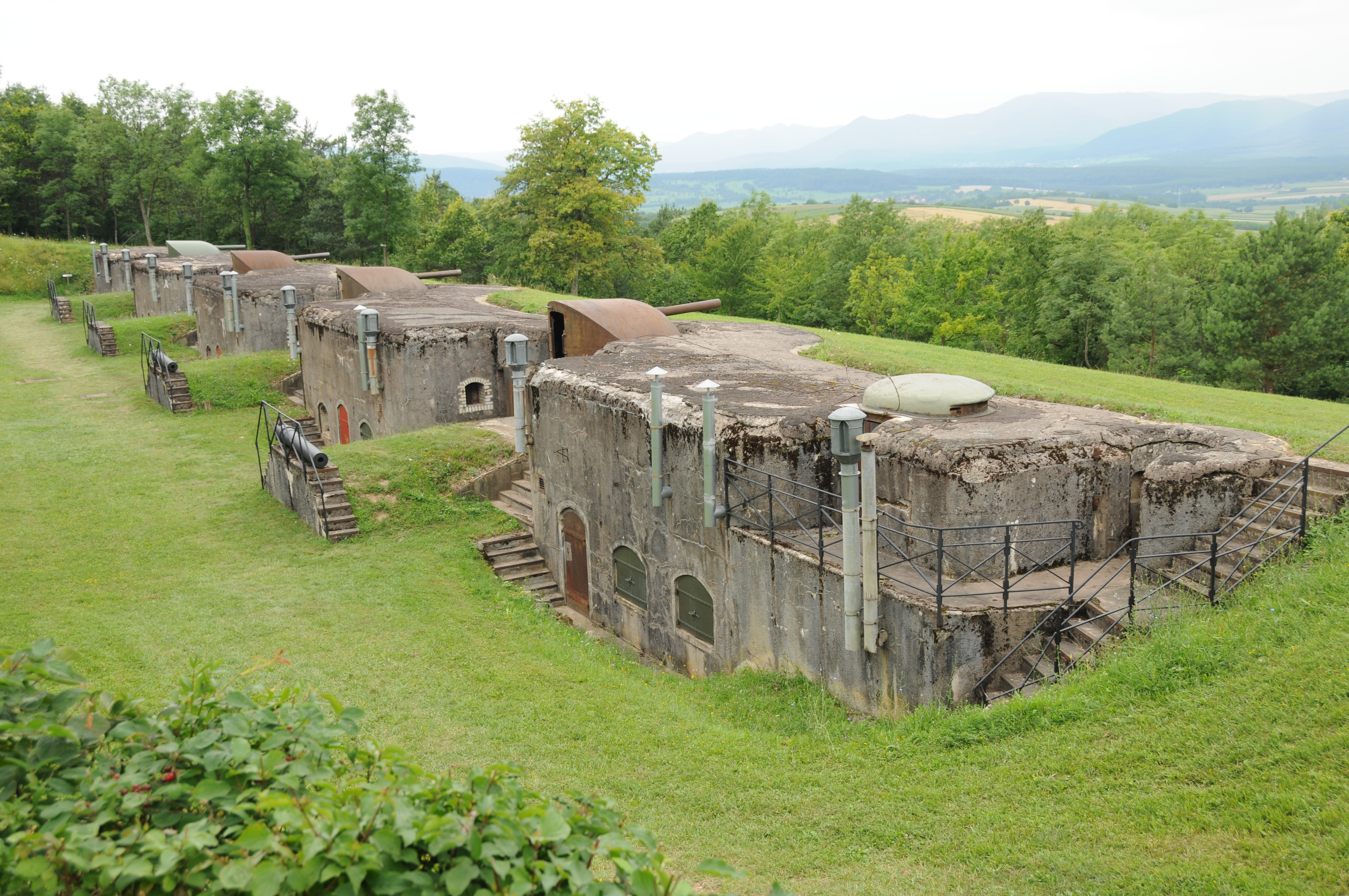
Battery No.1 at Mutzig

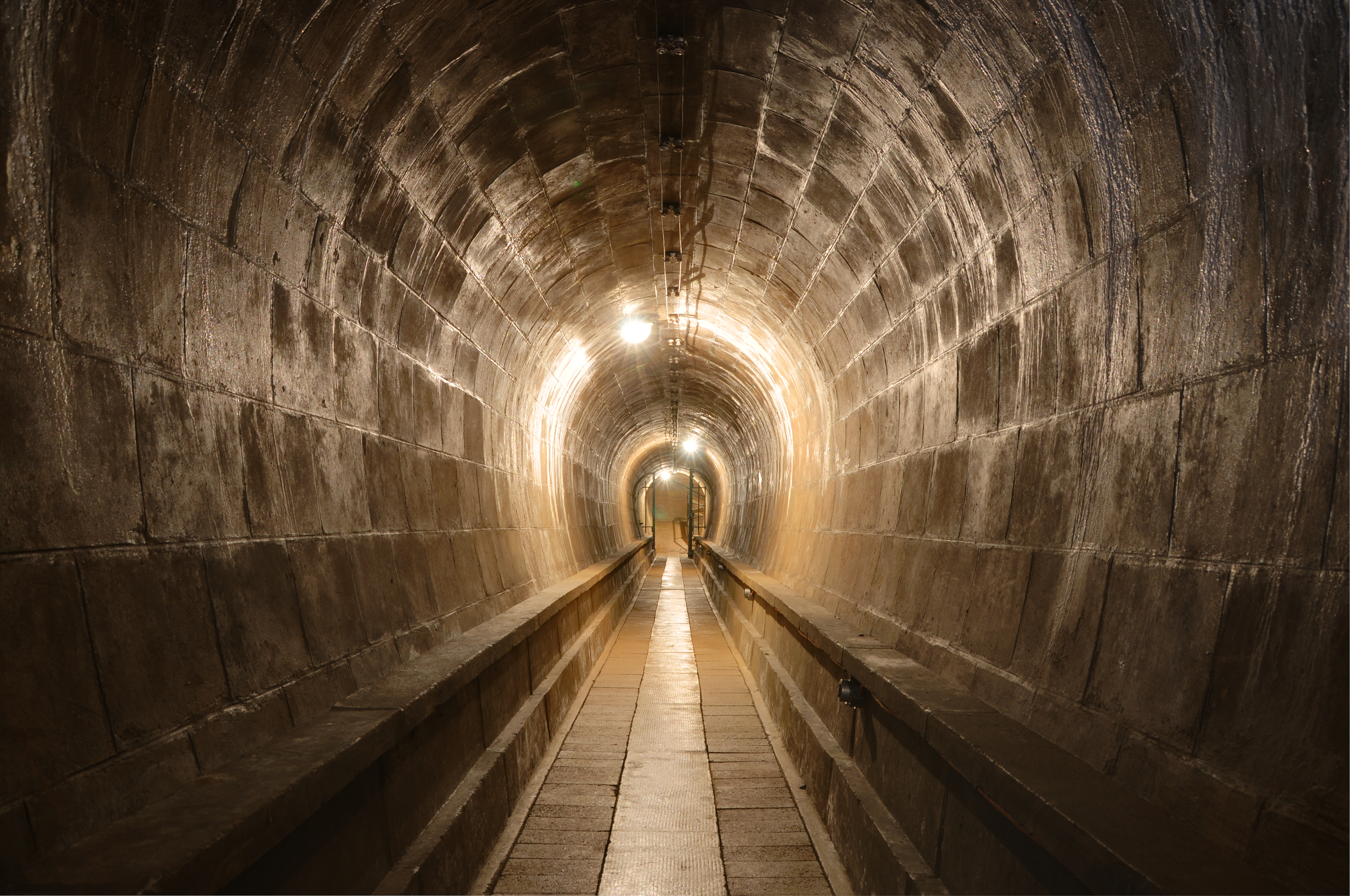
Tunnel in Fort de Mutzig

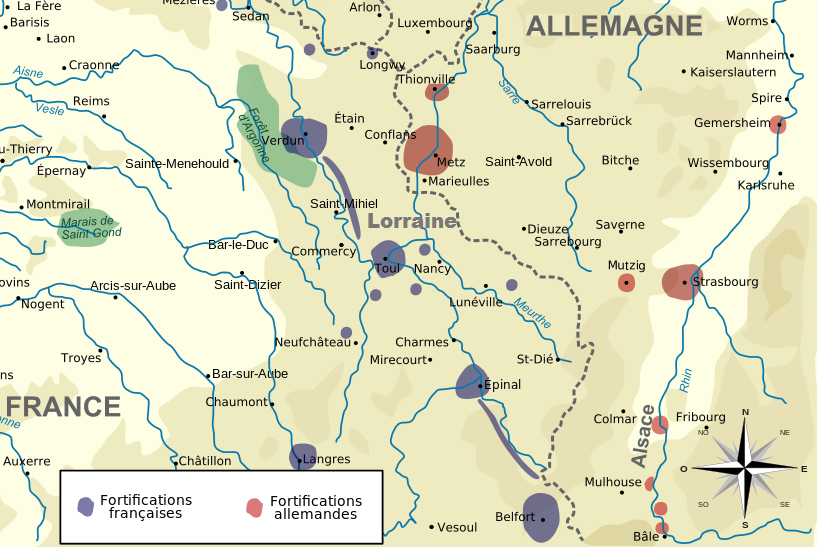
Franco-German border, 1914

The fortifications comprise three main portions. The newest section, and the place used for tours, is located in the northwestern fort. The 1895 west fort is located somewhat to the south, and the eastern fort about one kilometer to the east of the western fort. Together they comprise a Feste, or fortification, a concept which was later developed in the construction of the French Maginot Line fortifications.

In 1914, the 254-hectare (630-acre) fort comprised 50 buildings, with an underground space of approximately 40,000 square meters (400,000 square feet). With 22 turrets equipped with 10 cm and 15 cm howitzers at a maximum rate of fire of 6.5 tons of shells per minute, Mutzig was one of the strongest forts in Europe. 8,000 troops of the German army manned the defenses of Strasbourg at the time. Forces were disposed in the ring of forts around Strasbourg, as well as the Vosges mountains for defense against French forces around Belfort.

The fort's armament included:

- 8 x 150 mm howitzers in turrets with a range of 8,500 metres (27,900 ft)
- 14 x 105 mm guns in turrets, of two models, with a range of up to 13,000 metres (43,000 ft)
- 8 x 57 mm guns in mobile turrets
- 12 x 53 mm guns in embrasures
- 12 armored observation points, two with periscopes, and 7 infantry observation positions

Three concrete barracks for the garrison and 18 concrete shelters for infantry were provided, along with four wells, bakeries and other support facilities distributed around the fortification.

== History ==
The province of Lorraine had been captured during the Franco-Prussian War, prompting an arms race in the form of fixed fortifications on the parts of France and Germany. The fortress saw no significant fighting during the First World War, and was handed over intact to the French Army after the Armistice of 1918, with the exception of about half of its 105 mm guns, salvaged in 1917 by the Germans. The French Army designated Mutzig a rear defense of the Rhine frontier.

During the Second World War the fortress was occupied for a time by German artillery and infantry regiments but on June 13, 1940 forces were ordered to evacuate the area and all the guns were decommissioned. Despite this, it was later bombed by the German Luftwaffe when it was suspected that French troops had taken possession. However, part of the Wehrmacht's 215th Infantry Division was in fact in the fortress at the time and more than 70 German soldiers were killed in the Stuka attack.

In November 1944 the US Third Infantry Division took the fortress, which was then thinly occupied by German forces who were forced to surrender after a short time for want of ordnance and reinforcements.

== The Fortress today ==
After the Second World War the fortress was used by the French Army for exercises up until the 1960s when it was abandoned but remained in the possession of the military. As the fortress never saw substantial military action, it remains one of the best preserved pre-World War I sites in existence. This enormous site, which retains almost all its original equipment, has been under a process of restoration by a joint German–French group since 1984 and in 1995 a Museum was opened to the public together with some restored areas of the site. Local historical reenactment groups also make use of the fortress. Since 2014 the fortress has been known by its original name, the Kaiser Wilhelm II fortress.
