= Château des Rohan (Mutzig) =

Museum and castle in Bas-Rhin, France

Coordinates: 48°32′11″N 7°27′13″E

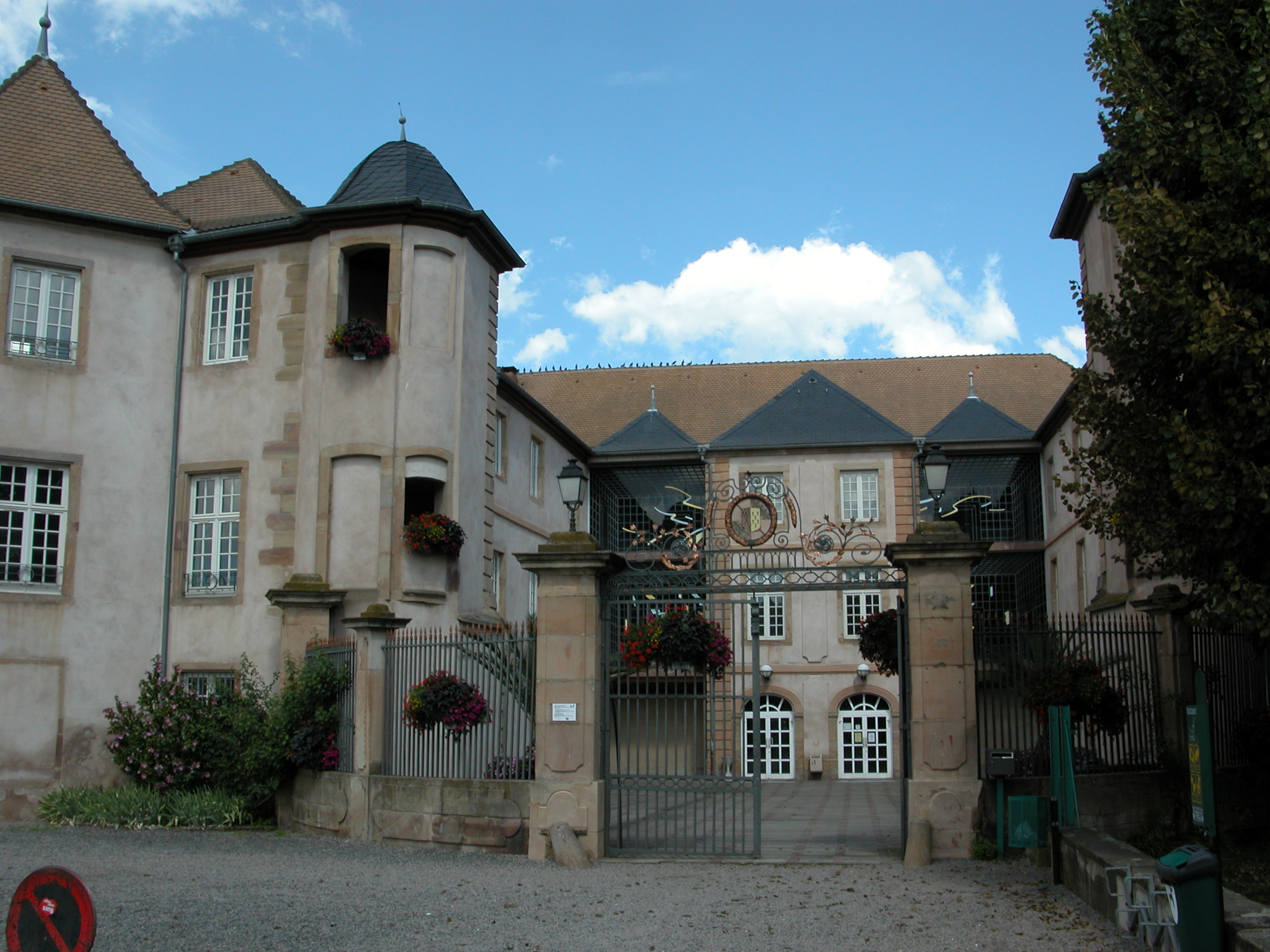
Main entrance of the castle

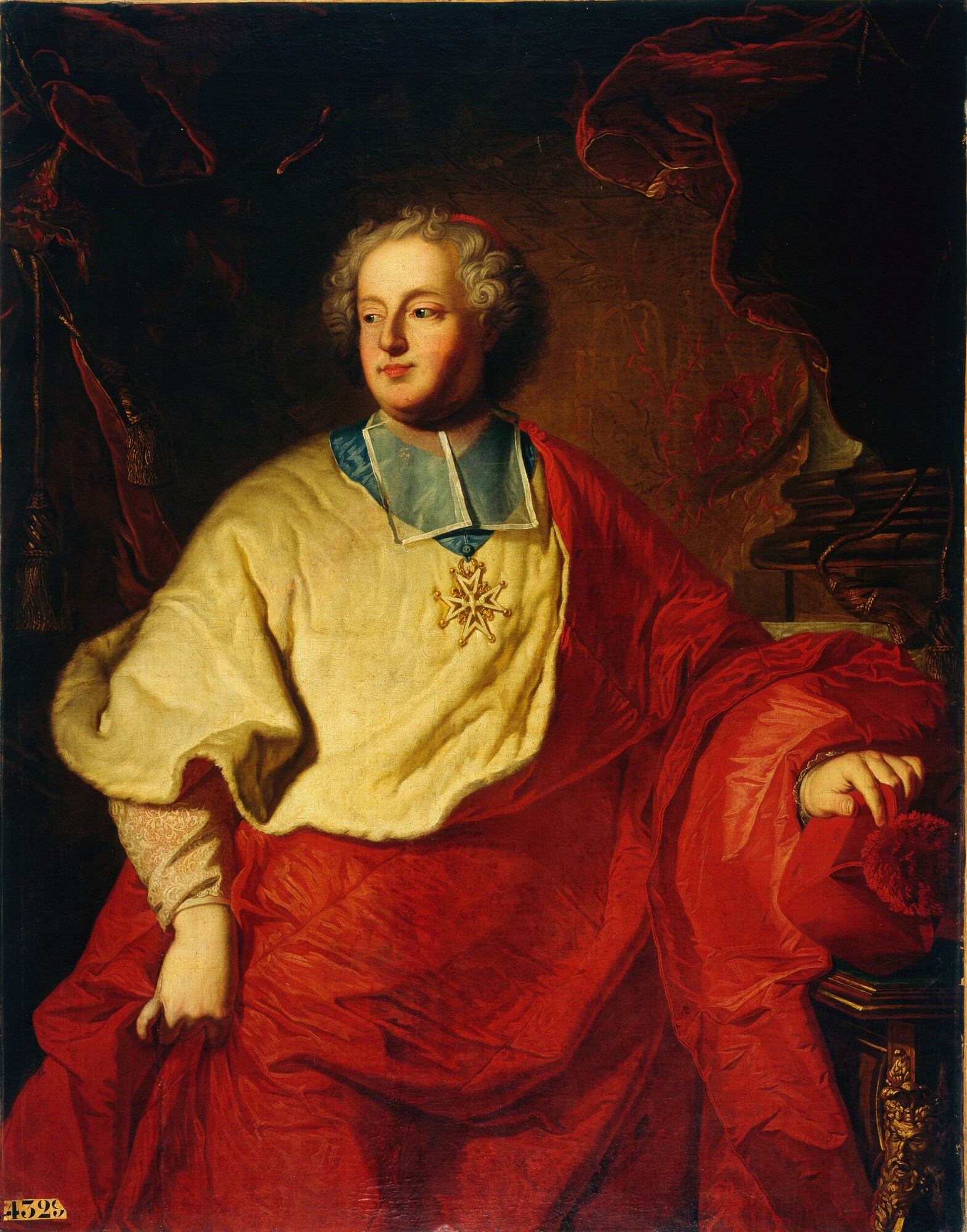
Armand Gaston de Rohan

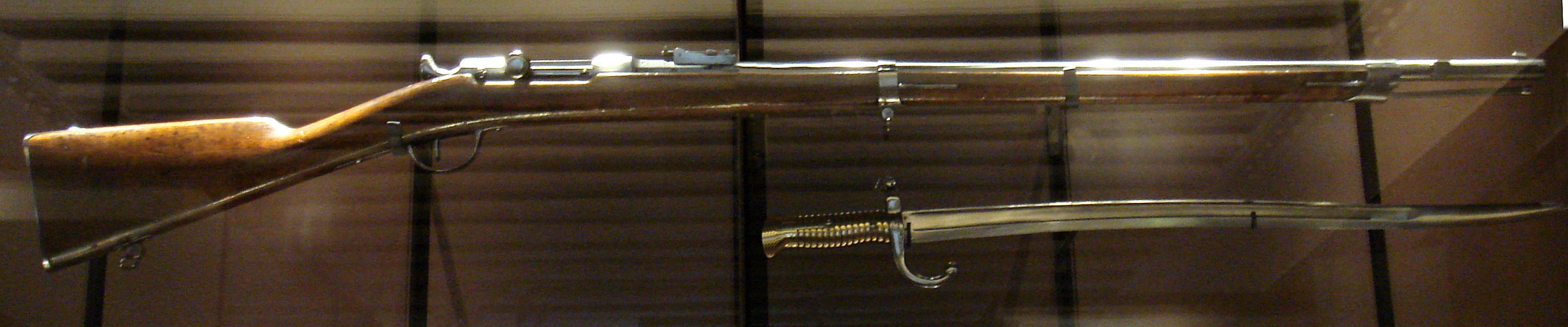
Chassepot gun model 1866 made in Mutzig in 1869

The Château des Rohan ("Castle of the Rohan") is a former castle and weapons factory now serving as a museum and cultural centre in the French town of Mutzig, Bas-Rhin, Alsace. The castle, whose structure goes back to the 13th century, belonged to several families of noblemen and bishops of Strasbourg before being turned into a rifle factory after the French Revolution. The castle is most famously associated with the House of Rohan and the Chassepot rifle.

== History ==
Mutzig's castle's history goes back to the fortification of the town in 1274 by Rudolph of Habsburg. The medieval castle, a Wasserburg (i.e. surrounded by a moat derived from a canal) was heavily destroyed by the Swedes in 1632, during the Thirty Years' War, after having already been assaulted by Ernst von Mansfeld's troops in 1622. The city's and castle's masters, during these times marked by frequent battles and rivalries between feudal families, were alternatively and sometimes simultaneously the bishops of Strasbourg and the House of Zweibrücken.

The castle as it now appears is a Baroque structure. It was inaugurated in its present shape in 1673 to serve as the residence of the bishop of Strasbourg, Franz Egon of Fürstenberg. Fürstenberg was succeeded by his brother Wilhelm Egon von Fürstenberg. After the family of Rohan took over the bishopric of Strasbourg, the castle served as a residence to the dukes Armand Gaston, François-Armand, Louis Constantin and Louis René Édouard de Rohan, between 1704 and 1790. However, after the completion of the Palais Rohan of Strasbourg in 1742, the château, which had already been rivalled by the residences in Saverne, became only of secondary importance to the family. Mutzig's castle was disowned and pillaged during the French Revolution. In 1799, it was bought by the arms manufacturers, brothers Coulaux of Klingenthal, Bas-Rhin, who, on 20. April 1801, opened their weapons factory in its walls. The factory ran until the outbreak of the Franco-Prussian War in 1870. It is there, in the Manufacture d'Armes de Mutzig (also known as Manufacture impériale de Mutzig) that the native of Mutzig, Antoine Alphonse Chassepot fabricated some of his famous rifles, one of the most advanced firearms of its time. The castle was fortified again by the Germans in 1893. Today, the castle houses a cinema and a library as well as, since 1996, the municipal museum Musée régional d'armes (previously, since 1977, the Musée des Rohan) displaying a vast collection of historic rifles.

The castle is listed as a Monument historique since 1976 by the French Ministry of Culture.

== See also ==
- List of castles in France
