= John Rowan =

John Rowan may refer to:

- John Rowan (American football) (1896–1967)
- John Rowan (footballer) (1890-1963), Scottish footballer
- John Rowan (high sheriff) (1778–1855), Irish high sheriff and militia officer
- John Rowan (Kentucky politician) (1773–1843), politician and jurist from the U.S. state of Kentucky
- John Rowan (New York), assemblyman 1777-78
- John Rowan (psychologist), author, counselor, psychotherapist and clinical supervisor
- John Rowan (United States Navy) (1919–2012), U.S. Navy captain
- John Rowan (Vietnam War veteran), sixth National President of Vietnam Veterans of America
- John M. Rowan (1829–?), politician from the U.S. state of Virginia

== See also ==
- Jon Rowan, English footballer
