= John Rowan (United States Navy) =

Captain John J. Rowan
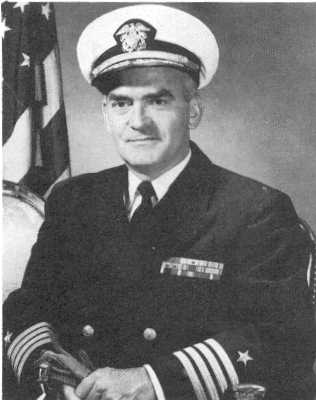
- Captain John Rowan as Commanding Officer, USS Annapolis (AGMR-1)
- Born: September 6, 1919; St. Paul, Minnesota
- Died: October 6, 2012 (aged 93)
- Military career
- Allegiance: United States of America
- Branch: United States Navy
- Service years: 1941–1966
- Rank: Captain
- Commands: USS Vincennes (CA-44); USS North Carolina (BB-55); USS De Haven (DD-469); USS Blue (DD-744); USS Lyman K. Swenson (DD-729); ComDesRon TWO; ComCruDesPac; NavCommFac, London; USS Newport News (CA-148); USS Wren (DD-568); U.S. Naval Academy as Assistant Chief Of Staff for Personnel and Administration; Director of Naval Communications as Director of Plans and Policy Division; Officer in Charge, Naval Communications System; USS Annapolis (AGMR-1)
- Conflicts: World War II; *1st Battle of Savo Island; *2nd Battle of Savo Island; Korean War; Vietnam War
- Awards: Purple Heart with Gold Star (2); Legion of Merit; Asiatic-Pacific Theater (9 Battle Stars); American Campaign Medal; American Defense Service Medal; Navy Occupation Service Medal; Philippine Liberation Medal; China Service Medal; World War II Victory Medal; Vietnam Service Medal; Vietnam Campaign Medal; Republic of Vietnam Meritorious Commendation

John J. Rowan (September 6, 1919 – October 6, 2012) was a captain in the United States Navy.

== Military career ==
=== World War II ===
Rowan graduated from the United States Naval Academy in December 1941. His first tour of duty as a newly commissioned ensign was aboard the heavy cruiser USS Vincennes (CA-44). He later received a citation for his participation on the Vincennes during the Doolittle Raid. When the ship was sunk in the first Battle of Savo Island, Ensign Rowan, with only a life jacket, waited five hours in the water until rescued.

After his rescue, he was assigned to the USS North Carolina (BB-55) for three months and then transferred to the USS De Haven (DD-469). Eight weeks after his assignment to the De Haven, it was sunk in the second Battle of Savo Island. Ensign Rowan sustained injuries and was in the water for two hours until rescued by a Landing craft tank which the ship had been escorting.

After the second rescue, he spent the next seven months recuperating from injuries in the San Diego Naval Hospital. While recuperating, he met and married Miss Mary Thompson (Durham, North Carolina), who was working at the hospital.

He returned to duty aboard the USS Blue (DD-744) and in late August 1945 he was the senior officer of the boarding party from the Blue that accepted the surrender of an I-400 class submarine, then the world's largest submarine. He also served on the USS Lyman K. Swenson (DD-729) and the staff of ComDesRon TWO, where he spent the remaining two years of the war and the first three post-war years.

=== Post-World War II ===
After attending postgraduate school in communications at the United States Naval Academy in Annapolis in 1948, Rowan was assigned to duty on the staff of ComCruDesPac in 1949 as communications officer and in 1952 to NavCommFac, London, as executive officer. He was awarded the Legion of Merit for his participation in planning the move of U.S. Communications Systems from France to Germany. In 1954, he reported as Operations Officer of the USS Newport News (CA-148), and in 1955 he assumed command of the USS Wren (DD-568). Two years later, he reported to the superintendent of the U. S. Naval Academy for duty as assistant chief of staff for personnel and administration.

=== Vietnam War ===
In April 1961, after twelve months as executive officer of the Newport News, Rowan was assigned to duty in Washington, D.C., with the Director of Naval Communications, where he served successively as director of the Plans and Policy Division; followed by officer in charge, Naval Communications Systems, Headquarters Activity; and then as director of the Program Division.

In September 1963, Rowan was hand picked as the prospective commanding officer of the Navy's first Communication Major Relay Ship USS Annapolis (AGMR-1). He served in this position until the ship's commissioning in March 1964. At that time, Rowan became the first commanding officer of the Annapolis and served in that position until April 1965, when he was relieved by Captain John Newland. As the first commanding officer of the USS Annapolis, the ship has the distinction because of his direct involvement and planning for the first "floating communications" station and first ship to transmit messages ship-to-shore via satellite.

== Retirement and death ==
Captain Rowan resided in Springfield, Virginia, Pinehurst, North Carolina, and Williamsburg, Virginia, with his wife Mary until his death on October 6, 2012. He received a burial with full honors in Arlington National Cemetery on October 18, 2012.

== Military awards and decorations ==

Legion of Merit	Purple Heart with 2 Gold Stars	American Defense Service Medal
Asiatic-Pacific Campaign Medal with 9 Battle Stars	American Campaign Medal	Navy Occupation Service Medal
World War II Victory Medal	National Defense Service Medal with bronze star	Philippine Liberation Medal
