= Dawn Rowan =

Dawn Rowan (born 15 February 1946, in Adelaide, South Australia) is a therapist who specialises in counselling adult survivors of childhood ritual, satanic, emotional, sexual and physical abuse. She has been the subject of one of the longest legal battles with the Federal Government of Australia in modern times.

== Legal case ==
In 1987 the Government of South Australia ceased funding the Christies Beach Women's Shelter, where Rowan was manager, due, it said, to 'unsubstantiated allegations' of misappropriation of funds, sexual misconduct, intimidation, physical harassment and unprofessional conduct - which were released in a report by the Health Minister, Dr John Cornwall, to the South Australian Parliament under parliamentary privilege. Rowan sued the Federal and South Australian governments and also two television networks. She also defended herself in a five-month court case in the Supreme Court of South Australia in 2001 - and won. On 21 June 2001, in a 300-page legal judgment, Justice Debelle ruled that all these allegations were 'false and a shocking defamation', motivated by malice. Rowan was awarded damages of A$340,000, which - with interest - totals $585,000.

Justice Debelle also noted: 'One curious feature of this litigation is the fact that files kept by the relevant departments, have, to a large extent, been lost or destroyed. Some files were destroyed or lost after this action had commenced. There were four State Government departments and one Commonwealth Government department involved in this matter... It is possible to understand that files from one department might have been inadvertently lost or destroyed. Coincidence cannot explain why files from five departments cannot be located...'

In this and subsequent court hearings (all the parties appealed) Rowan, who had no legal training, mostly represented herself against four legal teams - including QCs, senior and junior barristers, briefing solicitors and other supporting legal staff.

According to Rowan the case set legal precedents in the Westminster System in that citizens can now challenge parliamentary privilege via the 'tort of misfeasance' - abuse of public office.

An appeal in 2004 upheld the finding in Rowan's favour. A 2006 appeal in the Supreme Court of South Australia struck out one of Justice Debelle's findings (malice) and released the Commonwealth from liability. It ordered Rowan to pay the Commonwealth's costs, heavily discounted to $380,000 (the then-current value of her home). This judgment follows the rule on costs, which means the unsuccessful party (Rowan in this appeal) must pay the costs of all others joined in the action.

Rowan then made a submission to the Supreme Court claiming a 'perception of bias' on the part of at least two of the three appeal judges, which was not disclosed at any time in the trial. This was dismissed by the three appeal judges.

The Australian federal government then pursued Rowan in the Federal Court, declaring her bankrupt on 24 August 2007. Since then, she and her supporters have been urging the federal government to waive the debt she owes to the Commonwealth, because at all the hearings her innocence has been affirmed. Australia's Minister for Families, Housing, Community Services and Indigenous Affairs, Jenny Macklin, recommended an Act of Grace Waiver in May 2008. Over a year later (September 2009) the Minister for Finance, Lindsay Tanner, annulled Dawn Rowan's bankruptcy but is yet to make a decision on waiving her debt to the Commonwealth.

== Articles by Rowan ==
- Breaking Through: Women, Work and Careers Ed. Jocelynne A. Scutt (Rowan wrote Chapter 15 'Beware, Oh Take Care') (North Melbourne: Artemis Publishing, 1992; ISBN 1-875658-00-9)
