= Old Roan (disambiguation) =

Old Roan may refer to:

- Old Roan, an area in Aintree village, Merseyside, England
  - Old Roan railway station, a railway station in Aintree village
  - Old Roan Chase, a Grade 2 National Hunt chase run at the Mildmay Course at Aintree
- Old Roan, a former pupil of The John Roan School, a secondary school in Blackheath, London
