= Justice Roane =

Justice Roane may refer to:

- Archibald Roane (1759/60–1819), associate justice of the Supreme Court of Tennessee
- Spencer Roane (1762–1822), associate justice of the Supreme Court of Virginia
