= George Rowan =

Scottish footballer

Personal information
- Full name: George Rowan
- Place of birth: Scotland
- Position: Goalkeeper

Senior career*
Years	Team	Apps	(Gls)
- Eaglesham Amateurs
1972–1973	Queen's Park	11	(0)

International career
1973	Scotland Amateurs	1	(0)
- * Club domestic league appearances and goals

George Rowan is a Scottish retired footballer who played as a goalkeeper in the Scottish League for Queen's Park. He was capped by Scotland at amateur level.
