= Strawberry Roan =

The Strawberry Roan or Strawberry Roan may refer to:

- Red or “strawberry” roan, a horse coat color
- Strawberry Roan (1933 film), an American western film
- Strawberry Roan, a 1932 novel by A. G. Street
  - Strawberry Roan (1945 film), a British drama based on the novel
- The Strawberry Roan, a 1948 American western film
- The Strawberry Roan (song), an American cowboy song
