= USS Charles H. Roan (DD-853) =

Gearing-class destroyer

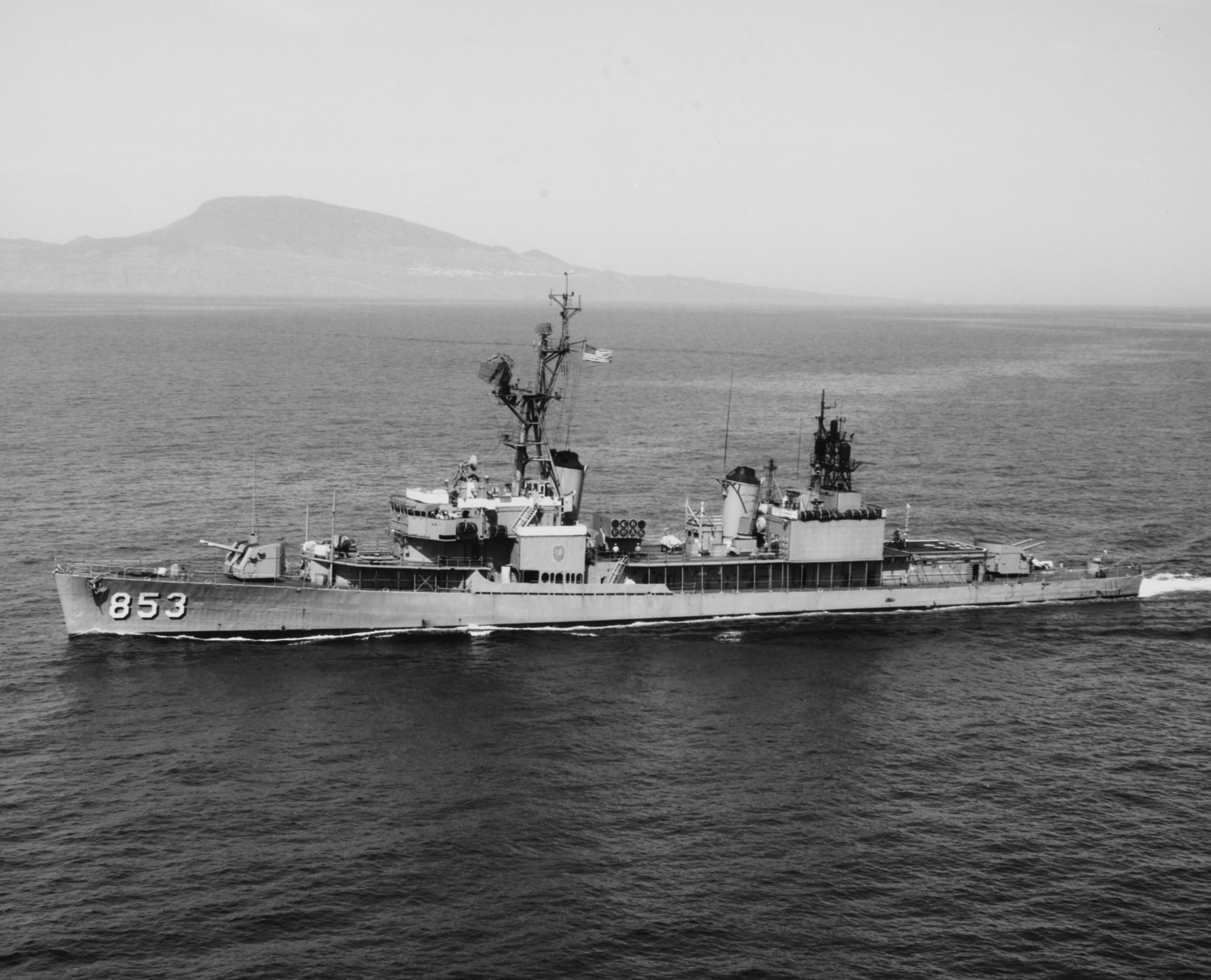
- USS Charles H. Roan, 26 May 1967

History

United States
- Name: Charles H. Roan
- Namesake: Charles H. Roan
- Builder: Bethlehem Steel, Quincy, Massachusetts
- Laid down: 27 September 1945
- Launched: 15 March 1946
- Sponsored by: Mrs. Lillabel Roan
- Commissioned: 12 September 1946
- Decommissioned: 21 September 1973
- Stricken: 21 September 1973
- Home port: Newport, Rhode Island
- Identification: Callsign: NBDP; Hull number: DD-853
- Nickname(s): The Jolly Cholly
- Fate: Transferred to Turkey 1973

Turkey
- Name: Mareşal Fevzi Çakmak
- Acquired: 1973
- Identification: D 351
- Fate: Scrapped January 1994

General characteristics
- Class & type: Gearing-class destroyer
- Displacement: 2,425 tons
- Length: 390.5 ft (119.0 m)
- Beam: 41.1 ft (12.5 m)
- Draught: 18.5 ft (5.6 m)
- Speed: 35 kn (65 km/h; 40 mph)
- Complement: 367
- Armament: 6 × 5 in (130 mm)/38 guns, 10 × 21 inch (533 mm) torpedo tubes

USS Charles H. Roan (DD-853) was a Gearing-class destroyer of the United States Navy. The ship was named after Charles Howard Roan, a United States Marine who lost his life in action on the island of Palau during World War II.

Charles H. Roan was built by the Bethlehem Steel Corporation's Fore River Shipyard at Quincy, Massachusetts, launched on 15 March 1946, and commissioned on 12 September 1946.

From her home port at Newport, Rhode Island, Charles H. Roan operated through 1960 on training exercises along the east coast and in the Caribbean. Typifying the manifold missions of the destroyer, she trained with aircraft carriers, with submarines, in convoy escort exercises, and in amphibious operations. In addition, she gave service as part of the midshipman training squadron, as engineering school ship for Destroyer Force, Atlantic, and in North Atlantic Treaty Organization exercises.

== History ==
=== 1950s ===
On her first overseas deployment, Charles H. Roan sailed from Newport 9 February 1948 for a cruise which took her to the Mediterranean and service with the 6th Fleet, then into the Persian Gulf. She returned to Newport 26 June, and took up the training schedule necessary to prepare her for a 1949 Mediterranean tour. In 1950 her armament was extensively altered, and her next lengthy cruise came in summer 1953, when she carried midshipmen to South American ports.

On 8 November 1950, USS Brownson and Charles H. Roan were engaged in night operations some 265 mi (426 km) off Bermuda. At 0103 the task group commander ordered the two destroyers to change station, a maneuver that required them to cross paths. Steaming at 20 knots (37 km/h; 23 mph) and running dark, the ships were on a collision course before anyone could take action to avoid disaster. At 0110, with sirens blaring a warning, they collided. Brownson’s bow tore a large hole in Charles H. Roan in the area of the after engine room and machine shop. Within fifteen seconds the ships had broken clear of each other revealing that the collision had sheared away a large section of Brownson’s bow and several forward ordnance storage compartments were flooding. Aboard Charles H. Roan, a sailor in the machine shop went into the sea through the hole torn in the hull, but within minutes Brownson’s boat had recovered him. He was a lucky one. As a result of the collision, five of Charles H. Roan’s crew died—three instantly, two later— and several were injured, two requiring hospitalization.

On 2 August 1954, Charles H. Roan stood down Narragansett with her division on the first leg of a round the world voyage. She sailed on to the western Pacific for 5 months of operations with the 7th Fleet, on patrol in the Taiwan Straits, and in carrier and amphibious exercises off Japan, Okinawa, and the Philippines. The division took departure from Subic Bay, 20 January 1955, and continued westward to call at Persian Gulf ports, transit the Suez Canal, and visit in the Mediterranean before returning to Newport 14 March. She resumed her training operations until 7 July, when she was ordered north to take station as a picket off Iceland and Greenland during the flight of President Dwight D. Eisenhower to the Geneva Summit.

Charles H. Roan's next Mediterranean cruise began with her sailing from Newport 14 September 1956 to join the 6th Fleet. With the eruption of the Suez Crisis that fall, she patrolled in the eastern Mediterranean. Since the Suez Canal was now blocked, December found Charles H. Roan bound for the Cape of Good Hope, rounding the African continent for 2 months of duty with the Middle East Force. Between 20 and 27 January 1957, she served as flagship for the Force Commander in a passage up the Shatt-al-Arab to visit Basra, Iraq. Her return passage to Newport found her rounding the Cape of Good Hope once more, and she reached home 3 April, in good time to take part in the International Naval Review in Hampton Roads in June. Late summer saw her crossing the Atlantic once more for visits to Plymouth, England, and Copenhagen, Denmark, while participating in North Atlantic Treaty Organization Operation "Strikeback."

Arriving at Annapolis on 12 July 1958 to take the midshipmen on board, Charles H. Roan got underway on what was to be a brief cruise. But plans swiftly changed upon the outbreak of the trouble in the Middle East which led to the landing of Marines by the fleet in Lebanon. First, Charles H. Roan proceeded to Norfolk, Virginia, to take on board additional stores and ammunition necessary for a lengthy deployment, then sailed south to escort an amphibious group to training operations designed as preparation for any extension of the Middle Eastern trouble. She proceeded on across the Atlantic, arriving at Naples 14 August to transfer the midshipmen to other ships. Thus released, she sailed on to the coast of Lebanon, where she and USS Forrest Royal patrolled in support of the forces ashore. Now trouble flared up in the Far East, as the Chinese Communists resumed the bombardment of the Chinese Nationalist-held offshore islands. Charles H. Roan and Forrest Royal joined the USS Essex group, augmenting the screen of two destroyers already accompanying the carrier. The group passed through the Suez Canal on 29 August 1958, and until 27 September 1958, she patrolled off Taiwan. Her return passage to Newport took her around the Cape of Good Hope. She arrived home on 18 November 1958 to a welcome in Narragansett Bay.

Adding to her list of historic operations, in the summer of 1959, Charles H. Roan participated in Operation "Inland Sea," the first passage of a naval force through the Saint Lawrence Seaway into the Great Lakes. She visited many ports and took part in the ceremonies dedicating the Seaway. On 31 March 1960, Charles H. Roan arrived in the Mediterranean again for a cruise which included duty with the key Middle East Force, and visits to many Persian Gulf ports. Returning to Newport in October, Charles H. Roan operated off the east coast for the remainder of the year.

=== 1960s ===
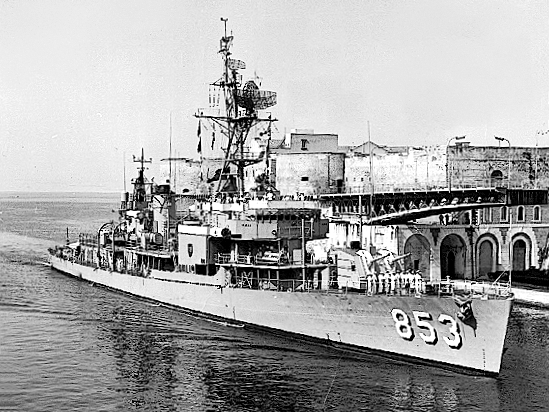
Charles H. Roan at Taranto in 1964.

On 31 March 1960, the ship once again travelled to the Mediterranean for a cruise which included duty with the key Middle East Force, cruising in the Red Sea, and visits to many Persian Gulf ports. On returning home, Charles H. Roan took on duties as DesLant Engineering School Ship until July 1961 when she entered the New York Naval Shipyard, Brooklyn, New York, for her Fleet Rehabilitation and Modernization (FRAM) conversion.

Upon completing FRAM in June 1962, the ship sailed to Guantánamo Bay, Cuba, for refresher training. She was back in Newport, Rhode Island, for two weeks before hastily departing for the Cuban Quarantine Operations. In 1963, after a midshipmen cruise to Halifax, Nova Scotia, Charles H. Roan was the third ship in the Atlantic Fleet to qualify with DASH (Drone Anti-Submarine Helicopters), and the first ship to use these helicopters operationally.

Now a first-line anti-submarine warfare (ASW) ship, Charles H. Roan again participated in a Mediterranean deployment with other units of the Sixth Fleet from April through August 1964. In November 1964, after her deployment to the Mediterranean and following a brief operating period with units of the Second Fleet, she entered Boston Naval Shipyard for a three-month scheduled overhaul.

Leaving the yard in February 1965, Charles H. Roan underwent refresher training at Guantánamo Bay, Cuba. This training was interrupted when she deployed to the Dominican Republic during that crisis, bringing with her one of the first Marine units to land in the Santo Domingo area. After her duties were completed in the Dominican Republic, Charles H. Roan departed for Guantánamo Bay, Cuba, to complete her refresher training.

During the Middle East deployment in March and April 1966, Charles H. Roan once again crossed the Equator. She returned to the Mediterranean via the Suez Canal and completed operations with the Sixth Fleet for two months, then returned home to Newport, Rhode Island. Later in September Charles H. Roan participated in joint Canadian/U.S. exercises, and paid another visit to Halifax, Nova Scotia.

In January 1967, Charles H. Roan was underway again for Guantánamo Bay, Cuba to undergo an Operational Readiness Inspection (ORI) along with other ships of Destroyer Squadron 10 (DesRon10). She spent a week of heavy exercising in the area of anti-submarine warfare and naval gunfire support prior to the scheduled ORI. She completed the ORI and proceeded to San Juan, Puerto Rico. From San Juan, she headed for Culebra where she did a naval gunfire support exercise and later on ASW exercises in the operation area. The Bahamas and Virgin Islands were visited on this cruise before she headed home to Newport. In March 1967, Charles H. Roan deployed to the Mediterranean again where she operated with the Sixth Fleet until the end of July. During this cruise she visited Tripoli, Libya, Valletta, Malta, Naples, and Taranto Italy, Athens (Piraeus), Greece, Bodrum, Turkey, Cannes, France, Naples, Italy, Gibraltar, among others. Charles H. Roan also provided support to other US Navy ships during the Six-Day War, and assisted in escorting USS Liberty to Malta for repairs after her attack by Israeli forces.

Charles H. Roan returned to Newport in August, and remained there except for brief service for the America's Cup Races, held off Newport. During the months of October and November she participated in ASW exercises in the North Atlantic. She returned to Newport, in November and remained there for TAV and holiday leave while preparing for another Mediterranean deployment in January 1968.

From 10 January until 20 May 1968 Charles H. Roan once again traveled to the Mediterranean to serve with the Sixth Fleet. During this cruise she visited Rota, Spain, Valletta, Malta, Barcelona, Spain, Naples, Italy, Ibiza, Spain, and Rhodes, Greece. While at Rhodes, Charles H. Roan assisted with the cleanup effort after the grounding of the destroyer USS Bache. Charles H. Roan began a four-month regular overhaul at Boston Naval Shipyard on 15 July 1968.

=== 1970s ===
On 5 April 1972 Charles H. Roan deployed from Newport. She circumnavigated the globe with port calls (chronologically) at Port of Spain, Trinidad; Recife, Brazil; Luanda, Angola; Lourenco Marques, Mozambique; Port Louis, Mauritius; Saint-Denis, Reunion; Colombo, Sri-Lanka; Manama, Bahrain; Mombasa, Kenya; Victoria, Seychelles; Tamatave, Malagasy Republic; Nossi-Be, Malagasy Republic; Karachi, Pakistan; Singapore; Hong Kong; Yokosuka, Japan; Midway Island; Pearl Harbor, Hawaii; San Diego, California; Panama Canal, to return to homeport at Newport on 31 October 1972. During this cruise she entered Vietnamese territorial waters, but because of earlier propeller damage, was not an active participant in action in the area.

After a deployment stand down and participating in a few local training exercises, the effort of the crew was directed toward decommissioning activities. On the morning of 21 September 1973, Charles H. Roan was decommissioned at Newport and immediately re-commissioned into the Turkish Navy as Maresal Fevzi Cakmak (D-351).

Charles H. Roan was struck from the Naval Vessel Register on 21 September 1973.

=== Transfer to Turkish Navy ===
Charles H. Roan was then transferred to the Turkish government, where she was known as TCG Mareşal Fevzi Çakmak (D 351) in the Turkish Navy. She took part in Operation Atilla during the Turkish invasion of Cyprus in 1974. On 21 July 1974, together with Turkish destroyers D 354 Kocatepe and D 353 Adatepe, she was subjected to friendly fire from Turkish warplanes and heavily damaged after being mistaken for a Greek ship. She was scrapped in January 1994.
