= Rohan (name) =

Rohan is both a given name and a surname. It has multiple origins, including Arabic, Persian, Indian, Irish and Scottish Gaelic, and Japanese.

In Arabic, it means "spiritual." In Persian, Rohan means good character and piety. In Sanskrit and Hindi, it means "ascending" or "ascent" and is a name of Vishnu. In Gaelic, Rohan is a variant of the name Rowan, which can mean red, red-haired, or rusty. In Japanese, it is an uncommon name, meaning "accompanying dew" and may be given either as a nom-de-plume or to a fictional character.

The later European surname is derived from Rohan, a commune in the Brittany region of France.

Notable people with the name include:

== Given name ==
- Rohan Amerasekera (1916–1974), first native Commander of the Sri Lanka Air Force
- Rohan Bewick (born 1989), Australian rules footballer for the Brisbane Lions
- Rohan Bopanna (born 1980), Indian tennis player
- Rohan Campbell (born 1997/1998), Canadian actor
- Rohan Davey (born 1978), Jamaican-born American football quarterback
- Rohan de Saram, British-born Sri Lankan cellist
- Rohan Dennis (born 1990), Australian racing cyclist
- Rohan Gavaskar (born 1976), Indian former cricketer
- Rohan Gunaratna (born 1961), Sri Lankan terrorism expert
- Rohan Jayasekera (cricketer) (born 1957), cricketer who represented Sri Lanka and Canada
- Rohan Jayasekera (writer) (born 1961), British journalist and advocate for freedom of expression
- Rohan Jones (born 2001), Canadian football player
- Rohan Kanhai (born 1935), Guyanese cricketer
- Rohan Kōda (born 1867 as Shigeyuki Kōda), Japanese writer
- Rohan Marley (born 1972), Jamaican businessman, Bob Marley's son
- Rohan O'Grady (1922–2014), pen name of Canadian novelist June O'Grady (Skinner)
- Rohan Pethiyagoda (born 1955), Sri Lankan taxonomist
- Rohan Ricketts (born 1981), English footballer
- Rohan Sinanan, Trinidad and Tobago politician
- Rohan Sippy, Indian film director
- Rohan Smith (born 1973), Australian rules footballer
- Rohan Suppiah (born 1982), Malaysian cricketer

== Surname ==
- Alexander J. Rohan (1911–1985), American labor union leader
- Benjamin de Rohan, duc de Soubise (c. 1580–1642), Huguenot leader
- Charles de Rohan, prince de Soubise (1715–1787), peer and marshal of France
- Denis Michael Rohan (born 1941), Australian who attempted to burn down the al-Aqsa mosque in 1969
- Emmanuel de Rohan-Polduc (1725–1797), Spanish Grand Master of the Order of Saint John
- Enda Rohan (born 1929), Irish chess master
- Gary Rohan (born 1991), Australian rules footballer
- Guy Auguste de Rohan-Chabot (1683–1760), also called Chevalier de Rohan, an opponent of Voltaire
- Henri, Duke of Rohan (1579–1638), French soldier, writer and leader of the Huguenots
- Hercule Mériadec, Duke of Rohan-Rohan (1669–1749), French aristocrat
- Jack Rohan (1931–2004), American college basketball player and coach
- John Murray Rohan (1889–1960), Australian sports journalist.
- Jiří Rohan (born 1964), Czechoslovak and Czech slalom canoer
- Louis René Édouard, cardinal de Rohan (1734–1803), prince de Rohan-Guemenée, archbishop of Strasbourg
- Lukáš Rohan (born 1995), Czech slalom canoeist
- Michael Scott Rohan (1951–2018), Scottish fantasy and science fiction author
- William M. Rohan (1873–1959), farmer and assemblyman from Wisconsin

== Fictional characters ==
- Prince Rohan, the hero of Melanie Rawn's Dragon Prince trilogy of fantasy novels
- Rohan, a character in the novel The Invincible
- Rohan, a character in the television series The Legend of Korra
- Rohan, a character in the television series The Mystic Knights of Tir Na Nog
- Rohan, a character in the video game Destiny 2
- Rohan Kishibe, a character in the manga series JoJo's Bizarre Adventure: Diamond Is Unbreakable, and main character of its spin-off Thus Spoke Kishibe Rohan
- Rohan Kumakura, a minor character from AI: The Somnium Files
- Rohan Singh, a major character in the Disney sitcom Best of Luck Nikki

== See also ==
- Rowan (name)
- House of Rohan
