= Charles H. Roan =

US Marine and Medal of Honor recipient (1923–1944)

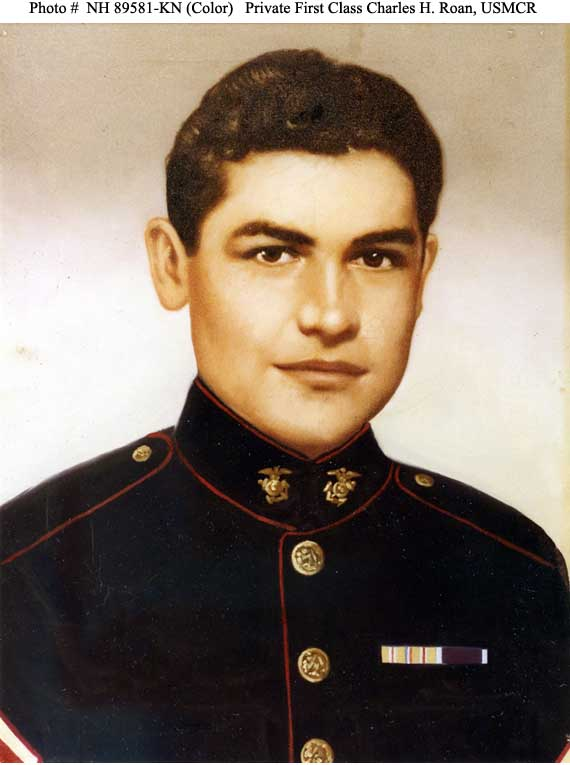
- Private First Class Charles Howard Roan, United States Marine Corps, World War II Medal of Honor recipient
- Born: August 16, 1923; Claude, Texas
- Died: September 18, 1944 (aged 21); Peleliu, Palau Islands
- Burial place: Manila American Cemetery
- Military career
- Allegiance: United States
- Branch: United States Marine Corps
- Service years: 1942–1944
- Rank: Private First Class
- Units: 2nd Battalion, 7th Marines, 1st Marine Division
- Conflicts: World War II: New Guinea campaign; Operation Cartwheel; Battle of Peleliu †
- Awards: Medal of Honor; Purple Heart

Private First Class Charles Howard Roan (August 16, 1923 – September 18, 1944) was a United States Marine who sacrificed his life by falling on a grenade to save those of four fellow Marines in the landing on Peleliu during World War II. For his heroism, he posthumously received his nation's highest military honor – the Medal of Honor.

On July 21, 1945, in a simple presentation ceremony on the Armstrong County Courthouse lawn, Mrs. Lillabel Roan, of Claude, Texas, accepted the Medal of Honor posthumously awarded her son, Pfc. Charles Howard Roan, USMCR.

== Biography ==
=== Early years ===
Charles Howard Roan was born August 16, 1923, in Claude, Texas. Until he performed his act of sacrifice, his life had been that of any small-town American boy. Charles attended the local high school and worked in a local garage.

=== Marine Corps service ===
The youth enlisted in the Marine Corps Reserve in December 1942. A rifleman in the 2nd Battalion, 7th Marines, 1st Marine Division, he was already a veteran of bitter fighting when he threw himself upon a Japanese hand grenade in the Peleliu landing, saving four Marines in his unit at the cost of his own life on September 18, 1944. Prior to his death, he had been in two previous battles – New Guinea and Cape Gloucester — and had seen 15 months of overseas duty.

== Medal of Honor citation ==
For his actions at Peleliu in 1944, the Medal of Honor was awarded to Roan with the following citation:

The President of the United States takes pride in presenting the MEDAL OF HONOR posthumously to

PRIVATE FIRST CLASS CHARLES H. ROAN
UNITED STATES MARINE CORPS RESERVE

for service as set forth in the following CITATION:

For conspicuous gallantry and intrepidity at the risk of his life above and beyond the call of duty while serving with the Second Battalion, Seventh Marines, First Marine Division, in action against enemy Japanese Forces on Peleliu, Palau Islands, 18 September 1944. Shortly after his leader ordered a withdrawal upon discovering that the squad was partly cut off from their company as a result of their rapid advance along an exposed ridge during an aggressive attack on the strongly entrenched enemy, Private First Class Roan and his companions were suddenly engaged in a furious exchange of hand grenades with Japanese forces emplaced in a cave on higher ground and the rear of the squad. Seeking protection with four other Marines in a depression the rocky, broken terrain, Private First Class Roan was wounded by an enemy grenade which fell close to their position and, immediately realizing the imminent peril to his comrades when another grenade landed in the midst of the group, unhesitatingly flung himself upon it, covering it with his body and absorbing the full impact of the explosion. By his prompt action and selfless conduct in the face of almost certain death, he saved the lives of four men. His great personal valor reflects the highest credit upon himself and the United States Naval Service. He gallantly gave his life for his comrades.

/S/ HARRY S. TRUMAN

== Awards and decorations ==
PFC Roan earned the following decorations for his service

1st row	Medal of Honor		Purple Heart with 5/16 inch star
2nd row	Combat Action Ribbon	Presidential Unit Citation	Marine Corps Good Conduct Medal
3rd row	American Campaign Medal	Asiatic-Pacific Campaign Medal with 3 Campaign stars	World War II Victory Medal

== Namesakes ==
The United States Navy destroyer, the USS Charles H. Roan (DD-853) was named in his honor.

The Texas State Veterans Home in Amarillo, opened in 2007, bears the name of Charles H. Roan.

PFC Roan's name is inscribed on the Wall of the Missing at the American Battlefield Monuments Commission Cemetery outside the city of Manila, Philippines.

A memorial marker in honor of Roan is located in the Claude Cemetery, Armstrong County, Texas

== See also ==
- List of Medal of Honor recipients
