= Mutzig =

- Commune
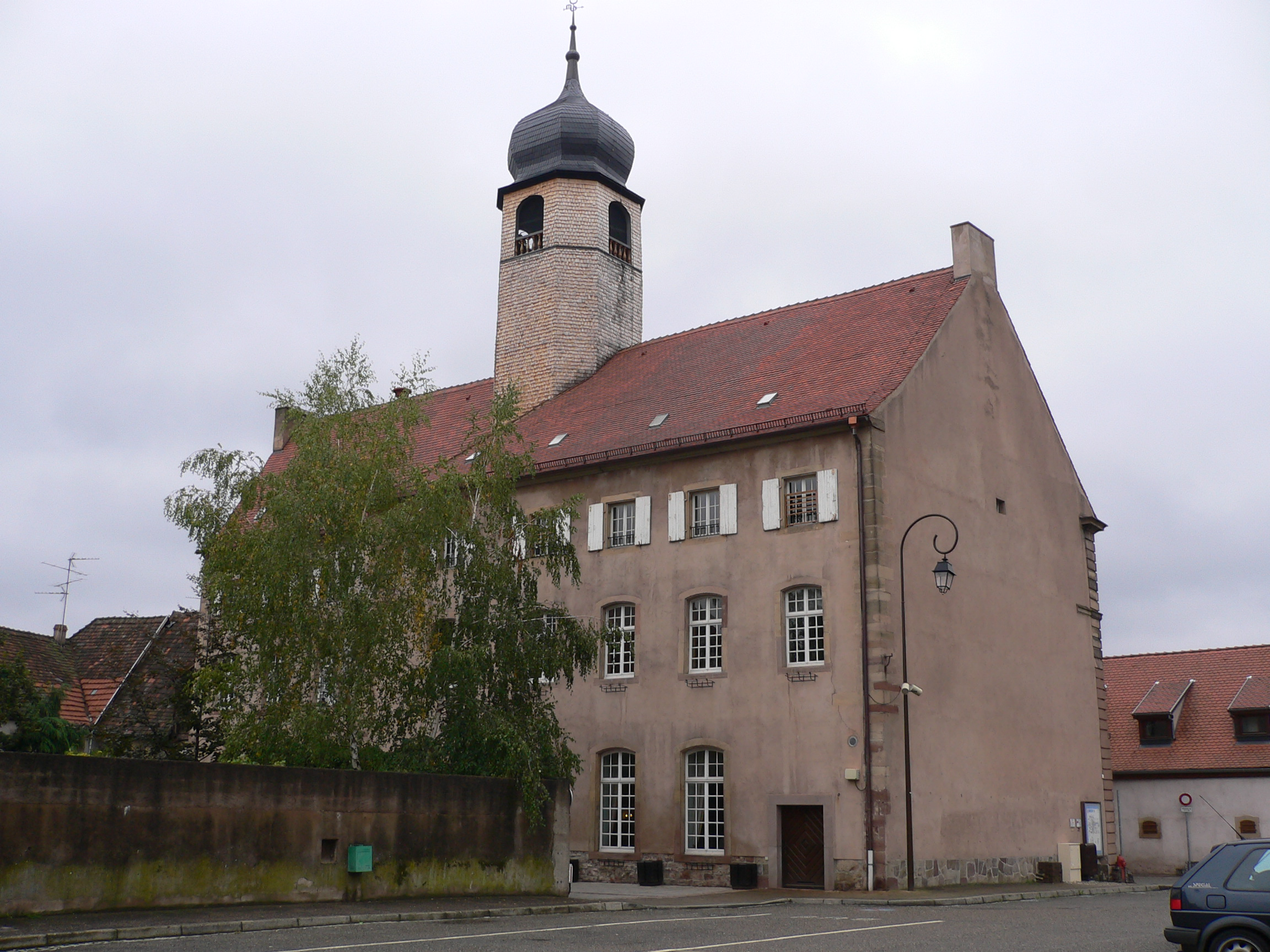
- Town hall

- Coat of arms
- Location of Mutzig
- Location within France Location within Grand Est
- Coordinates: 48°32′N 7°28′E
- Country: France
- Region: Grand Est
- Department: Bas-Rhin
- Arrondissement: Molsheim
- Canton: Mutzig

Government
  - Mayor (2020–2026): Jean-Luc Schickelé
- Area^{1}: 8.01 km^{2} (3.09 sq mi)
- Elevation: 193 m (633 ft)
- Highest elevation: 397 m (1,302 ft)
- Lowest elevation: 180 m (590 ft)
- Population (2023): 6,087
  - Density: 760/km^{2} (1,970/sq mi)
- Time zone: UTC+01:00 (CET)
  - Summer (DST): UTC+02:00 (CEST)
- INSEE/Postal code: 67313 /67190
- ^{1} French Land Register data, which excludes lakes, ponds, glaciers > 1 km^{2} (0.386 sq mi or 247 acres) and river estuaries.

Mutzig (French pronunciation: [mytsik] or [mutsik]; German: Mützig) is a commune in the Bas-Rhin department in Grand Est, in north-eastern France. The commune of Mutzig is located at the entrance of the Bruche river valley, on the Route des Vins d'Alsace.

== History ==
Evidences of human activities can be traced back to the Paleolithic era with the recent discovery of Neanderthal artifacts. The town Mutzig was first mentioned in the 10th century. It became part of the Prince-Bishopric of Strasbourg in 1308.

In the 19th century, several industries were established in Mutzig among which a weapon manufactory on the grounds of the former castle of the Cardinal de Rohan. In 1893, when Alsace was part of the German Empire, Kaiser Wilhelm II ordered the construction of a fort, the Feste Kaiser Wilhelm II, north of the town, as well as military barracks to defend Strasbourg against a potential French invasion.

== Population ==
Historical population
Year	Pop.	±% p.a.
1968	3,703	—
1975	3,891	+0.71%
1982	4,174	+1.01%
1990	4,552	+1.09%
1999	5,584	+2.30%
2007	5,924	+0.74%
2012	5,820	−0.35%
2017	6,011	+0.65%
2023	6,087	+0.21%
Source: INSEE

== Gallery ==
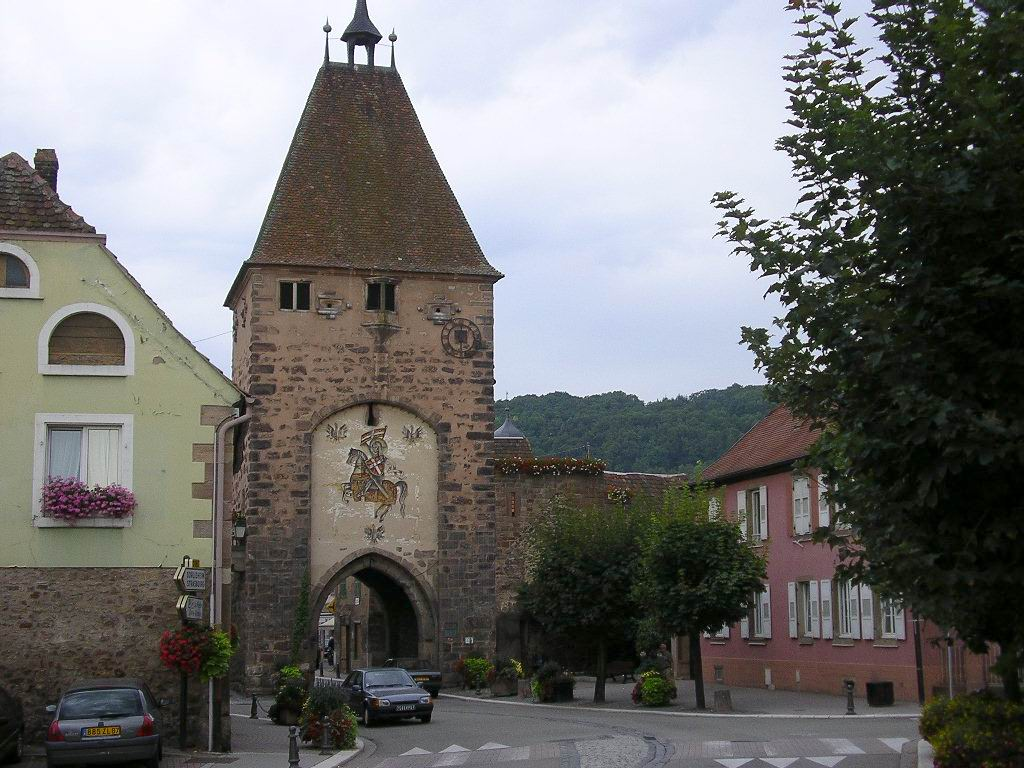
City gate.

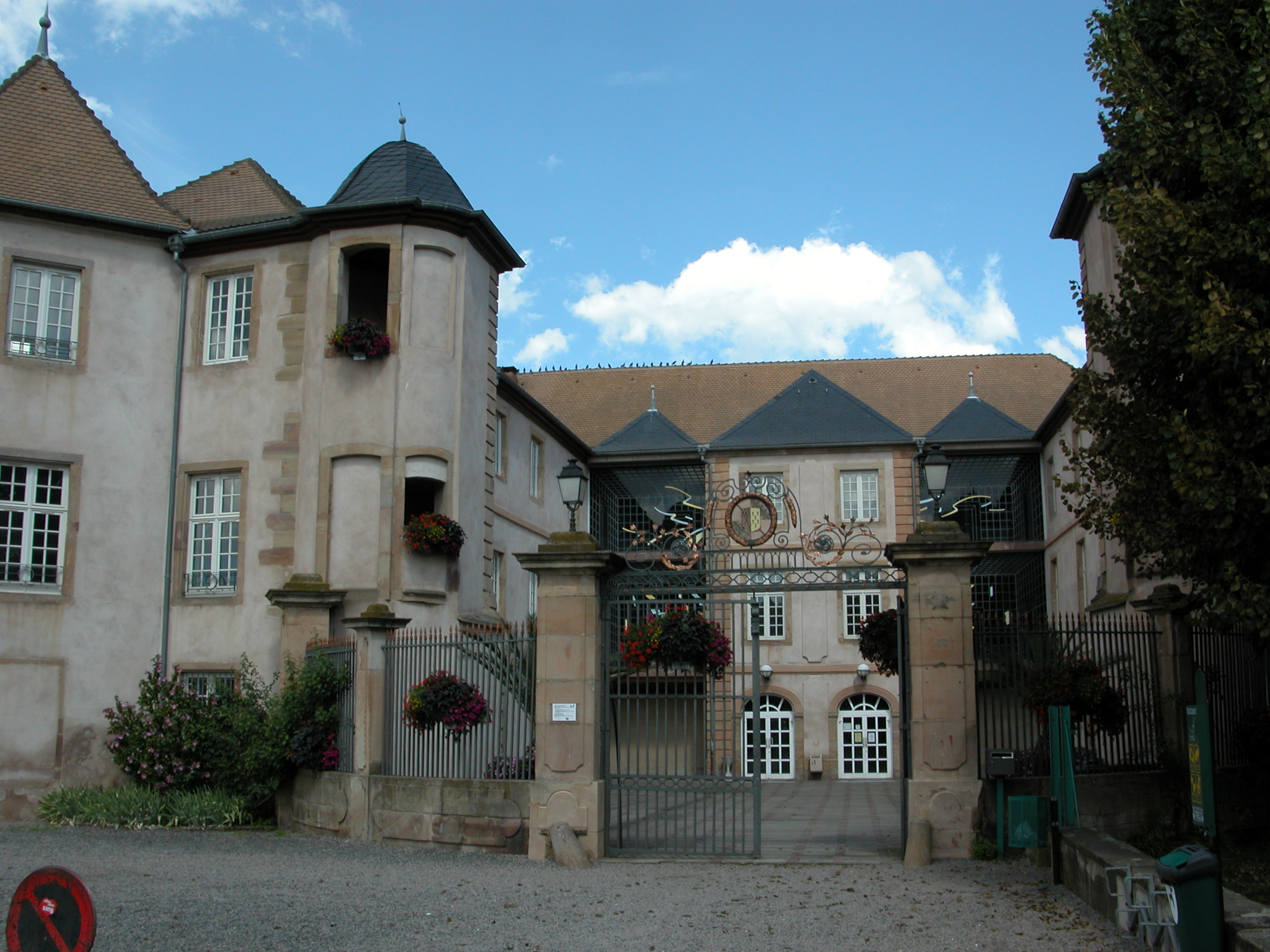
Château des Rohan.

== See also ==
- Communes of the Bas-Rhin department
