= Serbian Peabody rifle =

Peabody Model 1870
- Type: Service rifle
- Place of origin: Principality of Serbia

Service history
- Used by: Principality of Serbia
- Wars: Serbian-Ottoman wars (1876-1878)

Production history
- Designed: 1867
- No. built: about 50,000
- Variants: French model (Cal 14.9 mm); Austrian model (Cal 13.9 mm)

Specifications
- Mass: 4.45 kg
- Length: 1.43 m
- Barrel length: 863 mm/945 mm
- Caliber: 13.9/14.9 mm
- Action: Peabody action
- Rate of fire: 8-9 rounds/min
- Muzzle velocity: 330 m/s
- Feed system: Breech-loading

The Serbian Peabody rifle (Serbian: Пушка система Пибоди, Puška sistema Pibodi) is a single-shot breech-loading rifle made and used in the Principality of Serbia in the second half of the 19th century. It was the first Serbian military rifle to use metallic cartridges.

== Peabody Conversion Action (1867) ==
American inventor Henry Oliver Peabody (1826-1903) patented a new form of breech-loading rifle action in 1862, and his new Peabody rifles were sold in small numbers in the USA and Europe. Available records show that the third patent (No. 72,076, issued on December 10, 1867) obtained by Peabody was on an action system specifically designed and constructed for use in converting military muzzle-loading muskets into breech-loading arms. By the end of the American Civil War, the self-contained metallic cartridge was a sure thing; conversions of muzzle-loading rifles had already commenced and it seemed to be profitable for those involved. Peabody developed such an action based on his original idea of the rear-pivoted breechblock, for use with Springfield and Enfield muzzle-loading muskets. The Peabody alteration is simply a shallow version of his original action, but made without the finger lever and with the breechblock made with a tail-piece. The receiver is largely composed of two long narrow walls connected at the ends by thicker blocks of metal. The front end is bored and threaded to accept the barrel, while the back forms a tang to fill the recess in the musket stock left after the removal of the breech plug. The breechblock tailpiece extends to the rear, forming the operating lever. The breechblock is held in the receiver by a heavy screw going through both at the rear, allowing it to pivot. This breechblock screw is accessible over the stock edge so it can be easily removed, allowing the breechblock to be removed for cleaning. The top tang part of the receiver is grooved to make room for the tail-piece so that only the very end is above the grip line of the stock. The patent drawing shows the end of the tailpiece bent up so that it could be tipped up with the thumb. The firing pin lies in a groove cut into the right side of the breechblock. A firing pin for a rimfire cartridge would be straight with a rounded-tip end, while the centerfire pin would be with a forked tip. The breechblock was made with a novel safety feature in the form of a raised metal shoulder just behind the rear end of the firing pin, so the breechblock can only be opened when the hammer is either in the half-cock or full-cock position and the rifle cannot be fired unless the breechblock is fully closed. A stiff spring, fastened under the front end of the breechblock, extends to the rear where it contacts a notched bar in the rear bottom of the receiver. This spring supplies tension to the breechblock to hold it either in the closed or open position, as well as supplying some snap to the opening of the action to aid in case extraction and ejection.

The steps required to convert a muzzle-loading musket to a breechloader with this action consist of removing the original barrel from the stock, cutting off a section of the breech end equaling the length of the conversion action, threading the barrel and fitting it to the action, routing out the stock as required to accept the action, refitting the barrel and action in the stock and installing a new hammer on the lock. There were a great many different “conversion” actions developed between 1860 and 1870 (such as Snider-Enfield, Wanzl, Springfield Model 1873) and the Peabody action was at around the same level as any other.

Although the U.S. Government never purchased any of them, this Peabody conversion was adopted by the Principality of Serbia in 1870, and some 50,000 muzzle-loading rifles and Green percussion rifles were converted in 1870–1878. Serbian Peabody Model 1870 rifle was the main Serbian military weapon used in Serbian–Ottoman Wars (1876–1878).

== Serbian military rifle (1870-1880) ==
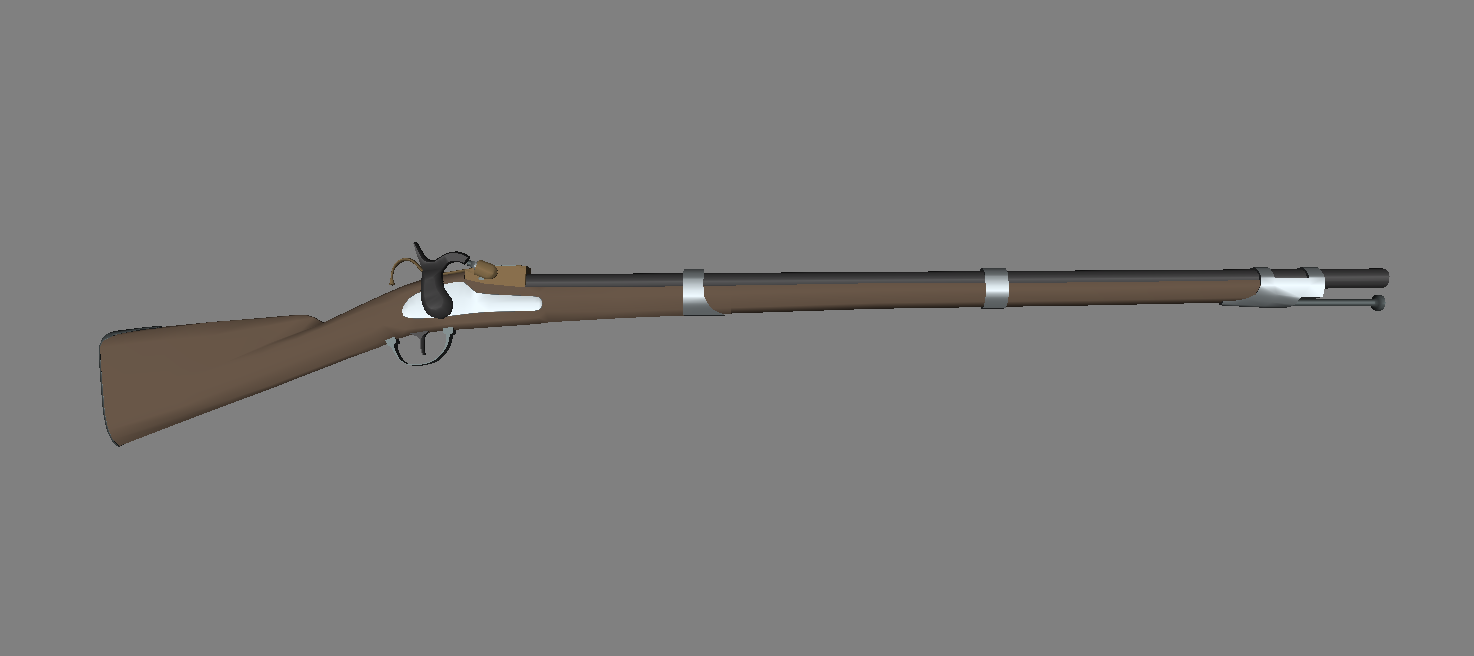
Peabody M1870 rifle (French variant), conversion of the Belgian rifled musket M1850/56. This was the first variant of Peabody M1870, made from the 1871.

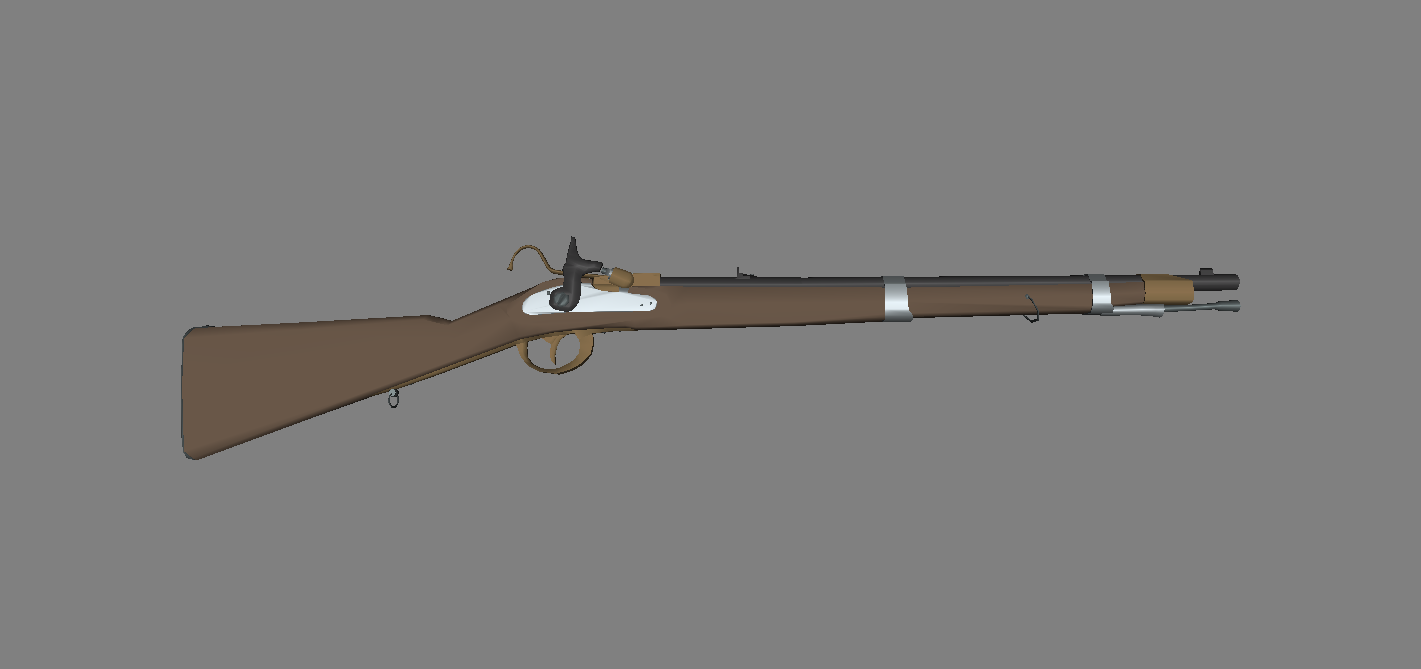
Peabody M1870 carbine (Austrian variant). These weapons were conversion of the earlier Green M1867 rifle, mostly made after 1876.

=== Production in Serbia ===
In 1865, the Principality of Serbia was still an Ottoman client state, but the Serbian government did its best to modernize the army, which consisted of some 5,000 professional soldiers in the Regular Army (Serbian: Стајаћа војска, Stajaća vojska) and all the able-bodied men in Serbia of age 20–50, who were conscripted for military service into the National Militia (Serbian: Народна војска, Narodna vojska) and divided into three classes, according to their age (the first class was men younger than 35, the third class older than 50). In 1863, Serbia had some 94,000 flintlock muskets (caliber 15–18 mm), of Austrian and Turkish origin, and some 31,000 flintlock rifles obtained from Russia, which were converted into percussion rifles in the Cannon Foundry in Kragujevac (at the time the only weapons factory in Serbia).

After 1866, the Serbian army was faced with the rapid modernization of its powerful neighbors and potential enemies, who had adopted new breech-loading military rifles; Austria upgraded its own Lorenz musket to Wanzl rifle (after 1867, replaced with Werndl rifle), while Ottomans adopted British-made Snider-Enfield (after 1870, replaced with the superior Martini-Henry). With no money to buy new breech-loading rifles, the Serbian government chose a cheaper solution: to upgrade some old muzzleloaders to breechloaders, using some of the existing conversion systems. However, existing conversion systems (as in Austrian Wanzl rifle, British Snider-Enfield and American Springfield M1873) worked only with small-caliber (under 15 mm) muzzleloaders, which the Serbian army did not have; most of the existing military rifles were large-bore (15–18 mm) Russian percussion muskets and carbines.

However, in 1867, large quantities of very cheap percussion rifles were available on the European market, as the end of the American Civil War (1861–1865) left many rifles made for the US army unsold in Europe, while the rapid adoption of breech-loaders by all the main powers made percussion rifles suddenly obsolete. In that situation, the Serbian government easily bought some 60,000 rifles in 1867: some 27,000 surplus Lorenz M1854 (cal 13.9 mm, known as Austrian caliber) were bought in Austria and 33.000 Belgian rifles M1850/56 (cal 14.7 mm, known as English caliber) were bought in Hamburg (of this number, 5,000 were sent as military aid to the Principality of Montenegro).

At the same time, as early as 1866, Serbian military experts chose the very cheap British Green brothers' system for the conversion of small-caliber muzzleloaders to breech-loading rifles.

In 1867, military workshops in Kragujevac began the modification of Lorenz M1854 rifles to the Green system; by 1869, all the 27,000 rifles were converted. However, the first use of these rifles, at a state funeral in 1868, showed a tremendous rate of misfire of more than 50%, which clearly showed the weakness of the Green system in practice. So in 1869, this conversion system was replaced by a more complex Peabody system, with a metallic cartridge, which was used to convert 28,000 Belgian 14.7 mm rifles in the Belgrade Arsenal from 1871 on. The war against the Turks was fought with these rifles in 1876–1878.

=== Military use ===
During the war against the Turks in 1876–1878, the second class of Serbian infantry was armed with Green system rifles, while the soldiers of the first class received more modern Peabody rifles. During the war, more than 6,000 Green rifles were converted to Peabody action; however, in 1877 Serbian army still had some 12,000 Green rifles in service. After the war, all of them were converted to the much better Peabody action. After 1880, Serbian Peabody rifles were mostly replaced by 100,000 more modern bolt-action Mauser-Koka rifles imported from Germany.
