= Green percussion rifle =

Serbian infantry rifle of the late 19th century

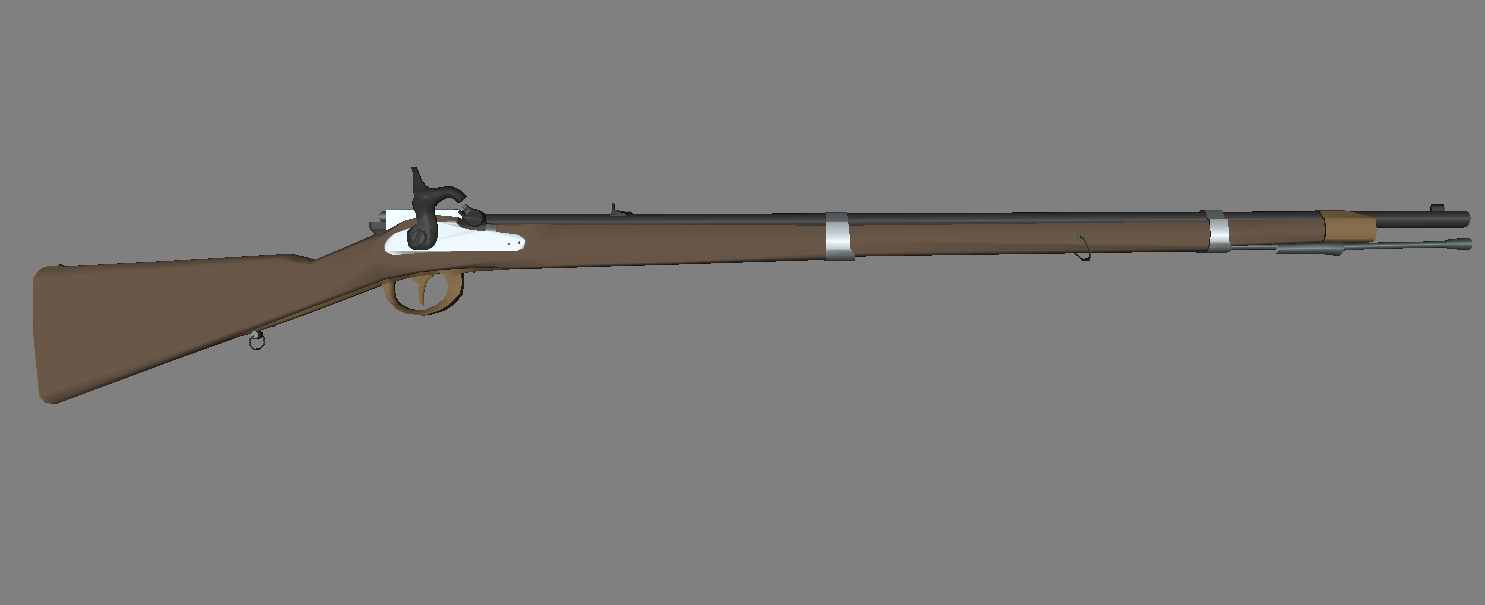
- 3D model of Serbian Green M1867 (Lorenz rifle conversion).
- Type: Service rifle
- Place of origin: United Kingdom

Service history
- Used by: Principality of Serbia
- Wars: Serbian-Ottoman wars (1876-1878)

Production history
- Designed: 1862
- No. built: 27,000

Specifications
- Mass: 4.5 kg
- Length: 1.335
- Cartridge: paper cartridge
- Caliber: 13.8 mm
- Action: bolt action with percussion lock
- Rate of fire: 3–6 rounds a minute
- Feed system: Breech-loading

Green percussion rifle (Serbian: Пушка система Грин, Puška sistema Grin), popularly known as Grinovača (Serbian: Гриновача, gree-noh-vah-chah), was a breech-loading percussion rifle used in the army of the Principality of Serbia in the second half of the 19th century.

== Design ==
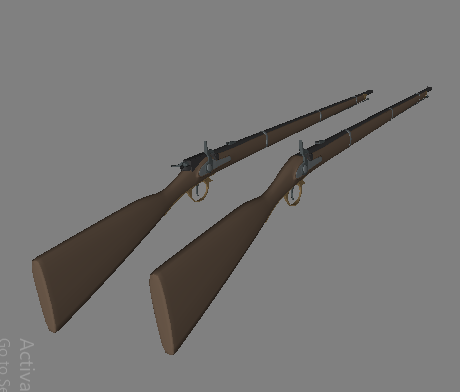
3D models of an Enfield 1853 and its adaptation, Green rifle. Pulling of the lever on the breechblock opens the top of the receiver for reloading.

Green percussion rifle was developed by the Green brothers of England between 1859 and 1860, with the aim of converting the existing British muzzle-loading rifles (mostly Pattern 1853 Enfield) into breechloaders (C.E. & J.Green's patent, No 2002 of July 12, 1862). An experimentally adapted Pattern 1853 Enfield rifle can be seen in Royal Armouries Museum in Leeds. While most of the early breech-loading rifles adopted after 1865 used integral metallic cartridges and had hinged breechblock (Snider-Enfield, Krnka, Wänzl, Springfield Model 1873) or falling block (Peabody, Martini-Henry) with firing pin, the Green system rifles had a primitive version of the bolt action, but they were loaded with a semi-integrated paper cartidge (without a primer), which was fired with the traditional percussion lock. A cylindrical breech block with a plug at the front end was moved in the square-shaped receiver of the rifle along the longitudinal axis by pulling a short horizontal lever at the rear end of the breech. By simply pulling the breechblock back, the chamber was opened and loaded with a semi-integrated paper cartridge (with powder and ball), after which it was closed by pushing the lever forward. Firing was done with percussion lock with an external hammer, which was manually cocked before each shot. When not in use, percussion cap was protected by a cover on a chain, so that it would remain in place during movement.

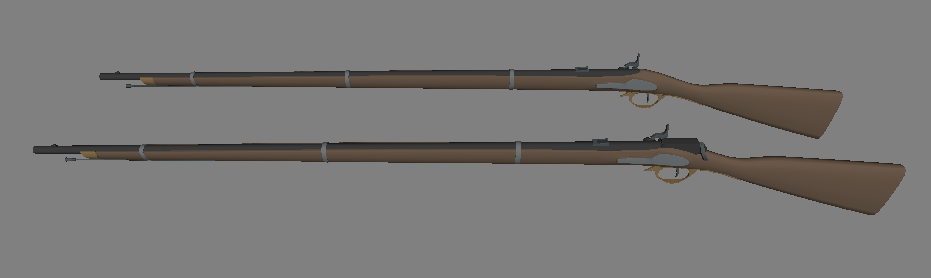
3D models of Enfield 1853 and its adaptation, Green rifle (on the picture). The only difference in appearance was a square shaped receiver on the breech, with a cylindrical breechblock moved by a horizontal lever on its posterior end. Serbian Green rifle was a conversion of the Austrian Lorenz rifle.

Unlike other early bolt action rifles (Dreyse, Chassepot), which were loaded with a composite paper cartridge (primer, powder, and ball in a paper tube), Green rifles were loaded with perforated paper cartridge (containing powder and Minie ball), and fired by traditional percussion lock, which ignited the propellant through the perforations in the paper.

== In Serbian army ==
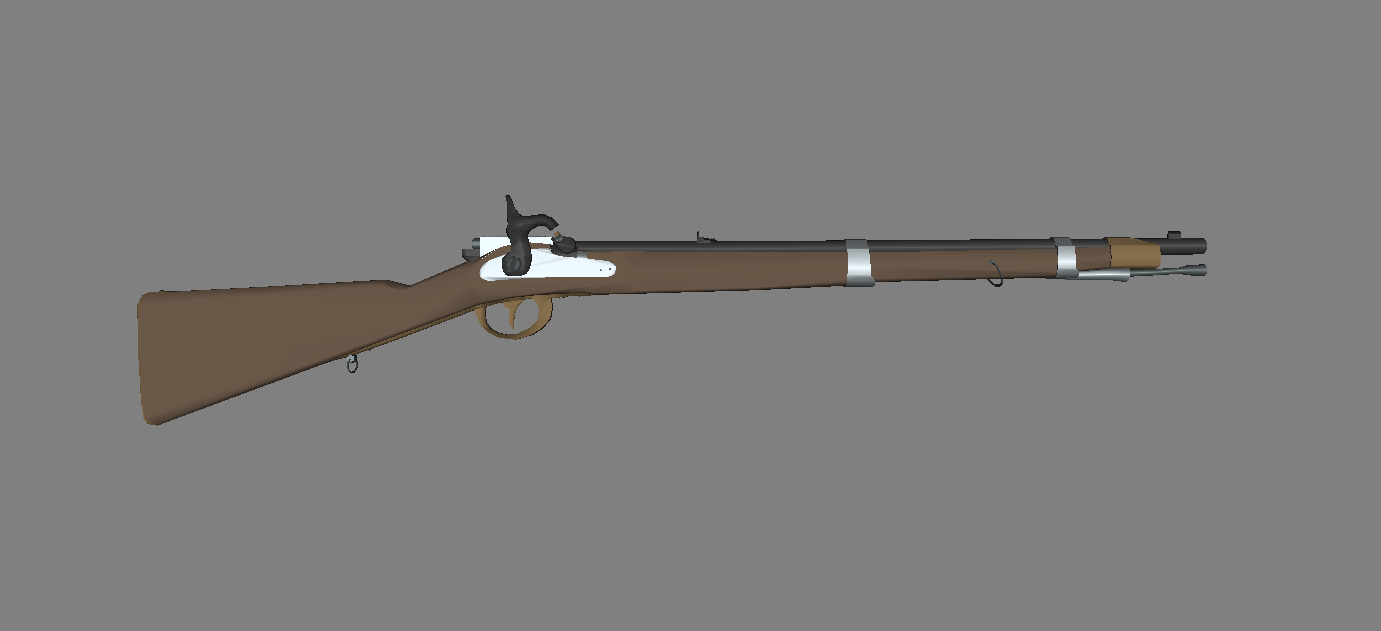
3D model of Serbian Green M1867 carbine.

At the time of their design in 1862, Green system rifles, basically just breech-loading percussion rifles without an integral cartridge, were considered obsolete in United Kingdom: when the military percussion rifles were converted into breechloaders in 1866, Snider-Enfield modification was adopted, with a hinged breechblock and firing pin, loaded with a metallic cartridge.

However, the simplicity and low cost of converting the existing muzzleloaders into the breechloaders of the Green system led the government of the Principality of Serbia to accept this system for the modernization of the Serbian army.

=== Lorenz rifle conversion ===
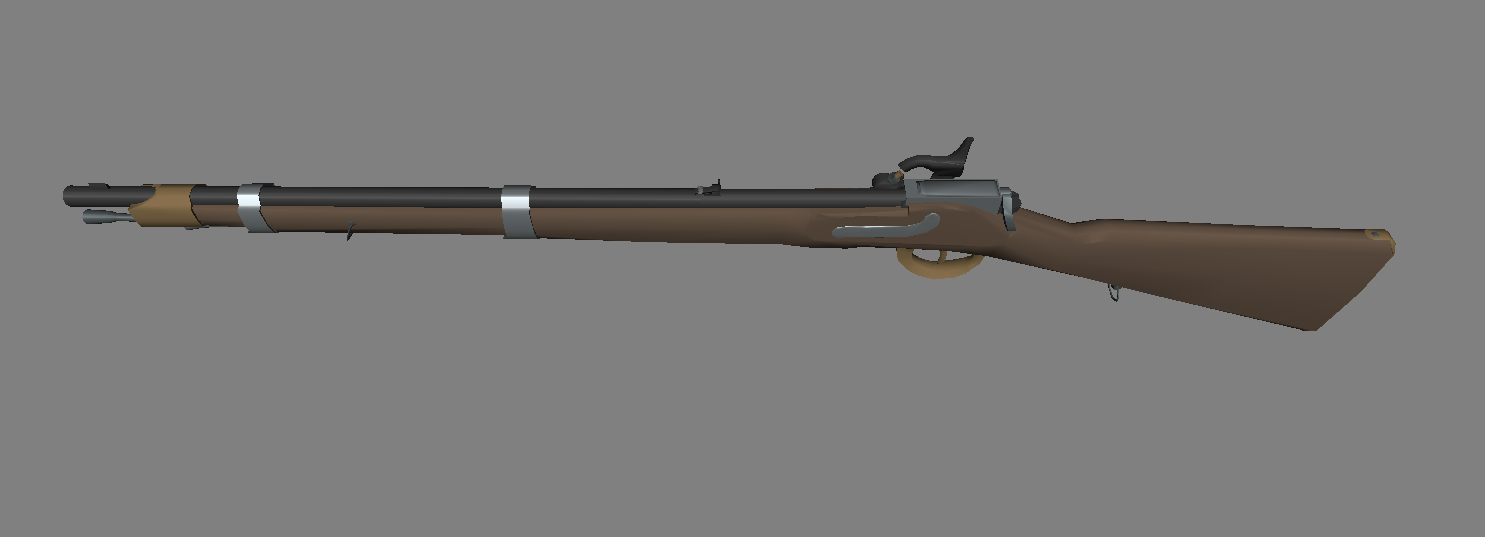
3D model of Green M1867 carbine: square receiver and cylindrical breechblock (bolt) with a small horizontal lever (only the posterior end visible) is clearly visible. Pulling the lever back would move the bolt and the top of the receiver backwards, opening the chamber for loading.

In 1865. Principality of Serbia was still an Ottoman client state, but nevertheless the Serbian government did it's best to modernize the army, which consisted of some 5.000 professional soldiers in the Regular Army (Serbian: Стајаћа војска, Stajaća vojska) and all the able-bodied men in Serbia of age 20–50, who were conscripted for military service into the National Militia (Serbian: Народна војска, Narodna vojska) and divided into three classes, according to their age (the first class were men younger than 35, the third class elder than 50). In 1862, Serbia had 94,000 rifles (caliber 13–18 mm), of Austrian and Turkish origin, and 31,000 flintlock rifles were obtained from Russia, which were converted into percussion rifles at the military workshops in Užice.

After 1866. Serbian army was faced with the rapid modernisation of its powerful neighbours and potential enemies, who had adopted new breech-loading military rifles: Austria upgraded its own Lorenz musket to Wanzl rifle (after 1867. replaced with Werndl rifle), while Ottomans adopted British-made Snider-Enfield (after 1870. replaced with even better Martini-Henry). With no money to buy new breech-loading rifles, Serbian government chose a cheaper solution, to upgrade some old muzzleloaders to breechloaders, using some of the existing conversion systems. However, existing conversion systems (as in Austrian Wanzl rifle, British Snider-Enfield and American Springfield M1873) worked only with small calibre (under 15 mm) muzzleloaders, which Serbian army did not have: most of the existing military rifles were large-bore (15–18 mm) Russian percussion muskets and carbines.

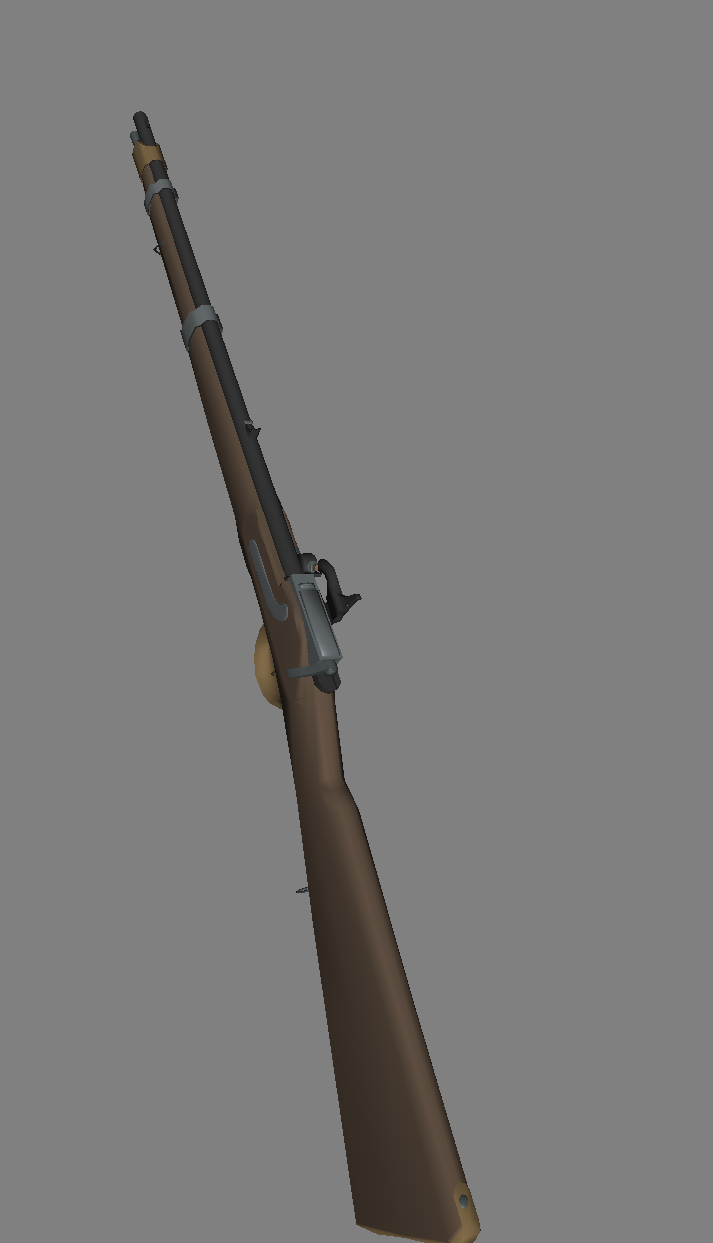
3D model of Green M1867 carbine: square receiver and cylindrical breechblock (bolt) with a small horizontal lever (only the posterior end visible) is clearly visible. Pulling the lever back would move the bolt and the top of the receiver backwards, opening the chamber for loading.

However, in 1867. large quantities of very cheap percussion rifles were available on the European market, as the end of American Civil War (1861–1865) left many rifles made for the US army unsold in Europe, while the rapid adoption of breech-loaders by all the main powers made them suddenly obsolete. In that situation, Serbian government easily bought about 60.000 rifles in 1867: some 27.000 surplus Lorenz M1854 (cal 13.9 mm, known as Austrian caliber) were bought in Austria and 33.000 Belgian rifles M1850/56 (cal 14.7 mm, known as English caliber) were bought in Hamburg (of this number, 5.000 were sent as military aid to Principality of Montenegro).

At the same time, as early as 1866. Serbian military experts chose the very cheap British Green brothers' system for conversion of small calibre muzzleloaders to breech-loading rifles.

In 1867, military workshops in Kragujevac began the modification of Lorenz M1854 rifles to the Green system: by 1869, all the 27.000 rifles were converted. However, the first use of these rifles on a state funeral (in 1868), showed a tremendous rate of missfire of more than 50%, which clearly showed the weakness of Green system in practice. So in 1869, this conversion system was replaced by a more complex Peabody system, with a metallic cartridge, which was used to convert 28.000 Belgian 14.7 mm rifles in the Belgrade Arsenal from 1871 on. The war against the Turks was fought with these rifles in 1876–1878.

=== Military use ===
On paper, new Serbian Green M1867 rifles were capable of firing 6 rounds a minute, about twice as many as the best older muzzleloaders. In practice, Green rifles were extremely unreliable, the main problem being their ammunition: paper cartridges tore easily, were unusable in dump weather and were hard to detonate with old percussion-lock system, which was intended to fire loose powder, not perforated paper cartridge. Rate of misfire was about 50%, and often several percussion caps were spent before a successful shot: that way, the consumption of caplocks was at least twice as with ordinary percussion rifles. To make things worse, the chamber and receiver clogged with powder residue easily, requiring cleaning after every 7–8 shots. That way, the actual rate of fire was almost less than 2–3 rounds a minute, an ordinary rate of fire for the older percussion rifles.

During the war against the Turks in 1876–1878, the second class of Serbian infantry was armed with Green rifles, while the soldiers of the first class received more modern Peabody rifles. During the war, more than 6.000 Green rifles were converted to Peabody action: however, in 1877. Serbian army still had some 12.000 Green rifles in service. After the war all of them were converted to much better Peabody action. The only known example of a Serbian Green M1867, listed under the name Infantry rifle Model 1862 (Lorenz) transformed to breachloader of the Lindner system, is held in the Naval Museum in Venice.

== See also ==
- Lefaucheux-Francotte M. 71, contemporary Serbian service revolver.
- Podewils gun, Bavarian rifled musket converted to breechloader (M1858/67), similar in appearance and action.
