= German military rifles =

The evolution of German military rifles is a history of common and diverse paths followed by the separate German states, until the mid-19th century when Prussia emerged as the dominant state within Germany and the nation was unified. This article discusses rifled shoulder arms developed in or for the military of the states that later became Germany; it excludes firearms of the Austrian Empire, except where they were used substantially by German troops.

There was also a period in the late 20th century when Germany was again divided and the two nations had separate armies and weapons, in "Cold War" opposition. The various rifles used during this period are displayed here, identified by either East German or West German usage.

== Early Jäger rifles ==
Jäger (German, lit. "hunter") were a type of soldier, a form of light infantry, first named by the Landgrave of Hesse when he formed such a unit from his foresters and huntsmen in 1631. Huntsmen and foresters recruited in certain German states were an established presence in German military units. They were often of middle-class backgrounds or belonged to the lesser nobility. These troops were primarily used for reconnaissance, skirmishing or screening bodies of heavier troops. Since they owned their own weapons there was little standardization, and the early rifles were generally designed for hunting. Jäger were not just skilled riflemen; they were also able to handle and maintain delicate, accurate rifles in an age when very few soldiers had mechanical skills.

== Jäger rifles (late 18th century) ==
By the late 18th century, these rifles had evolved to being shorter than earlier hunting weapons and were generally shorter than the typical military musket, with no provision for a bayonet. The shorter weapon was easier to load and more practical in skirmish combat. However, there was some loss of accuracy, and the shorter barrel used the powder charges less efficiently.

Jäger rifles typically had a length around 45 inches (1,100 mm), with a 30-inch (760 mm) barrel, and weighed around 9 lb (4.1 kg). Frequently there was a scrolled brass trigger guard to provide a better grip and a raised cheek-rest for support when aiming. Most rifles had a butt-trap or patch box about six inches long for storing greased linen patches and tools. The patch box lids were generally brass and were hinged at the rear. Most of these rifles were the personal property of the soldier and could vary substantially in design and decoration.

The Jäger rifle concept was adopted by other nations including Britain, which imported German Jäger rifles for use by skirmishers and marksmen. Many of these were Hanoverian and when Britain standardized with its Pattern 1776 rifle, it was essentially a copy of a Jäger style from Hanover. Hessian mercenary troops who fought for the British in the US Revolution included Jäger rifle units.

== 1810 Neue Korps-Jägerbüchse (Prussia) ==
During the early 19th century, Prussia began to standardize its military rifle. In 1810, as part of its strenuous effort to rebuild its army after the defeat at Jena-Auerstadt, the state officially adopted its first standard rifle, which was a combination of preferred features from previous weapons. It had a 28½" .58 caliber tapered and flared barrel, offering good balance. This was the only flintlock military rifle of a major military power to use set triggers, and was the first German rifle that could be fitted with a bayonet.

As with most early military rifles used by European forces, they were not designed to supplant the smooth bore musket, but meant to be a complementary weapon used by special units including light infantry, skirmishers, and snipers.

== 1811 Kavalleriebüchse (Prussia) ==
The 1811 Prussian Cavalry Rifle was almost completely redesigned: it was a new pattern featuring a new lock and hardware. It had a 17" octagonal barrel firing a .60 caliber bullet, but was changed to a round barrel in 1823.

== 1835 Neue Korps-Jägerbüchse (Prussia) ==
In 1835, the Germans converted most of the 1810 rifles to percussion and adopted a nipple safety, which is an arm that covers the percussion cap to prevent accidental discharge. This was also known as the Potsdam rifle. The barrel length is 28 5/8 inches in .60 caliber.

== Dreyse Needle Gun 1848 (Prussia) ==
Dreyse Needle Gun 1848

The Dreyse needle-gun (Nadelgewehr) was a military breechloading rifle, famous as the arm of the Prussians, who adopted it for service in 1848 as the Prussian Model 1848. Its name comes from its needle-like firing pin, which passed through the cartridge case to detonate a percussion cap at the base of the bullet. The Dreyse rifle was also the first breech-loading rifle to use a bolt-action to open and close the chamber.

The gun was the invention of the gunsmith Johann Nikolaus von Dreyse, who, beginning in 1824, had conducted multiple experiments, and in 1836 produced the complete needle-gun. From 1848 onward the gun was gradually introduced into Prussian service, then later into the military forces of many other German states. The employment of the needle gun radically changed military tactics in the 19th century.

The needle gun first made its appearance in street fighting during the May Uprising in Dresden in 1849. It also played an important role in the Danish–German War of 1864. The gun saw its heaviest use in the Austro-Prussian War of 1866 and the Franco-Prussian War of 1870–71. Because the breech-loader made it possible for a Prussian soldier to fire five (or more) shots, even while lying on the ground, in the time that it took his Austrian counterpart to fire one (and then reload while standing), it was seen as allowing the Prussians to sweep the field.

The cartridge used with this rifle consisted of the paper case, the bullet, the priming cap and the black-powder charge. The 15.4 mm (0.61 in) bullet was shaped like an acorn, with the broader end forming a point. It was glued in a paper case known as a Sabot. Between this inner lining and the outer case was the powder charge, consisting of 4.8 g (74 grains) of black powder. The upper end of the paper case was rolled up and bound together before the needle could strike the primer that was attached to the base of the bullet; its point then passed through the powder and hit the primer ahead. The theory behind this placement of the primer is that it would give more complete combustion of the charge.

In practice the needle-gun proved to have numerous deficiencies: its effective range varied a great deal, a significant amount of gas escaped at the breech when the rifle was fired, and a paper cartridge was used. An improved model, giving greater muzzle velocity and increased speed in loading, was introduced, but this was soon replaced by the Mauser rifle.

== M1854 Jäger rifle (Bavaria) ==
This percussion weapon combines French and German features with a browned barrel and a rear sight with windage adjustment. It is 50.25 inches (1,276 mm) long, with a .69 caliber 35.75-inch (908 mm) barrel. This is among the last military designs prior to adopting the Minie type ammunition.

== Vereinsgewehr 1856 (Württemberg, Baden, and Hessen) ==
This rifle was based on a Swiss pattern using Minie ammunition in .54 caliber. It was 55.5 inches (1,410 mm) long, with a 39.25-inch (997 mm) barrel. Most of these weapons were made in Liege or in the Württemberg state-run factory in Oberndorf.

== M1858 Jäger rifle (Bavaria) ==
This is a refinement of the Bavarian M1854 adopting Minie type ammunition and using simplified sights.

== M1858 Podewils gun (Bavaria) ==
The Podewils gun was a 13.9mm calibre rifle used in the Bavarian army since 1858. It was the most common infantry weapon of the Bavarian army in the Austro-Prussian War of 1866 and the Franco-Prussian War of 1870/71. Originally a muzzleloader, it was converted to breechloading in 1867, the so-called Lindner conversion. In 1869 the Bavarian army started to replace it with the Werder breechloader, but due to budgetary constrains by 1870 most Bavarian troops still used the Podewils while only four infantry battalions had received the Werder (primarily Jäger units).

== M1869 and M1869 "Aptiertes" Werder (Bavaria) ==
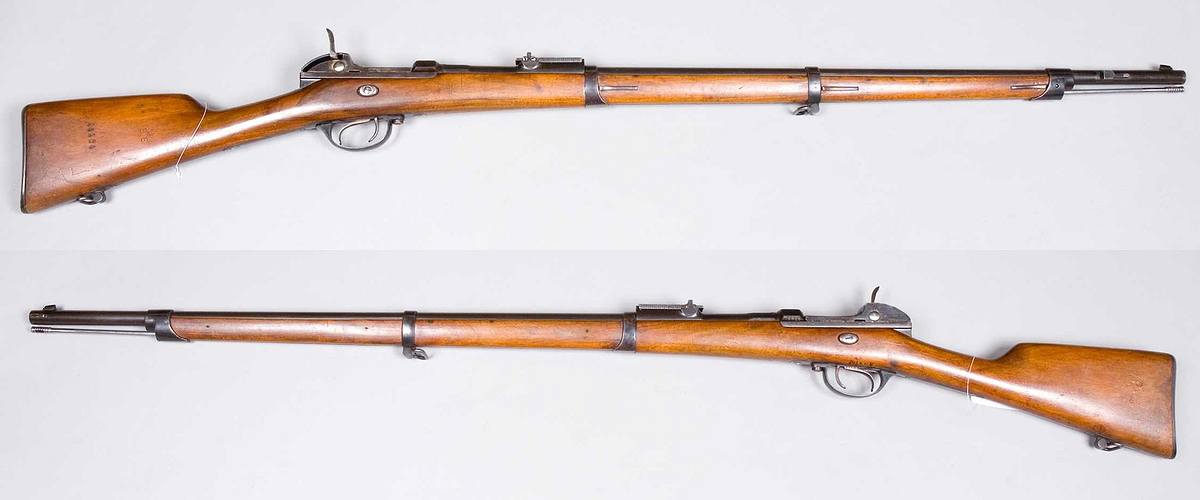
M1869 Werder rifle

Bavaria was engaged in several central European conflicts during the late 19th century, opposing Prussia in the Austro-Prussian War in 1866; however it then joined Prussia against France in 1870–71. Bavaria remained an autonomous state bound by treaty to Prussia between 1866 and 1870 and was incorporated into the newly established German Empire in 1871.

In 1869, Bavaria adopted the Werder M1869 Gendarmerie "Lightning" rifle chambered for a rimmed centerfire metallic cartridge, the 11×50mmR, a rifle designed by Johann L. Werder based on the Peabody dropping block action, to replace the breech loaded Lindner. After Prussia and others adopted the Mauser M1871 as their standard rifle Bavaria modified their Werder rifles into the "M1869 Aptiertes Werder", chambered for the same 11×60mmR cartridge as the Mauser M1871 used. The Werder remained the primary Bavarian arm until replaced by the Gewehr 1888.

== Infanteriegewehr M71, 1871 Mauser ==
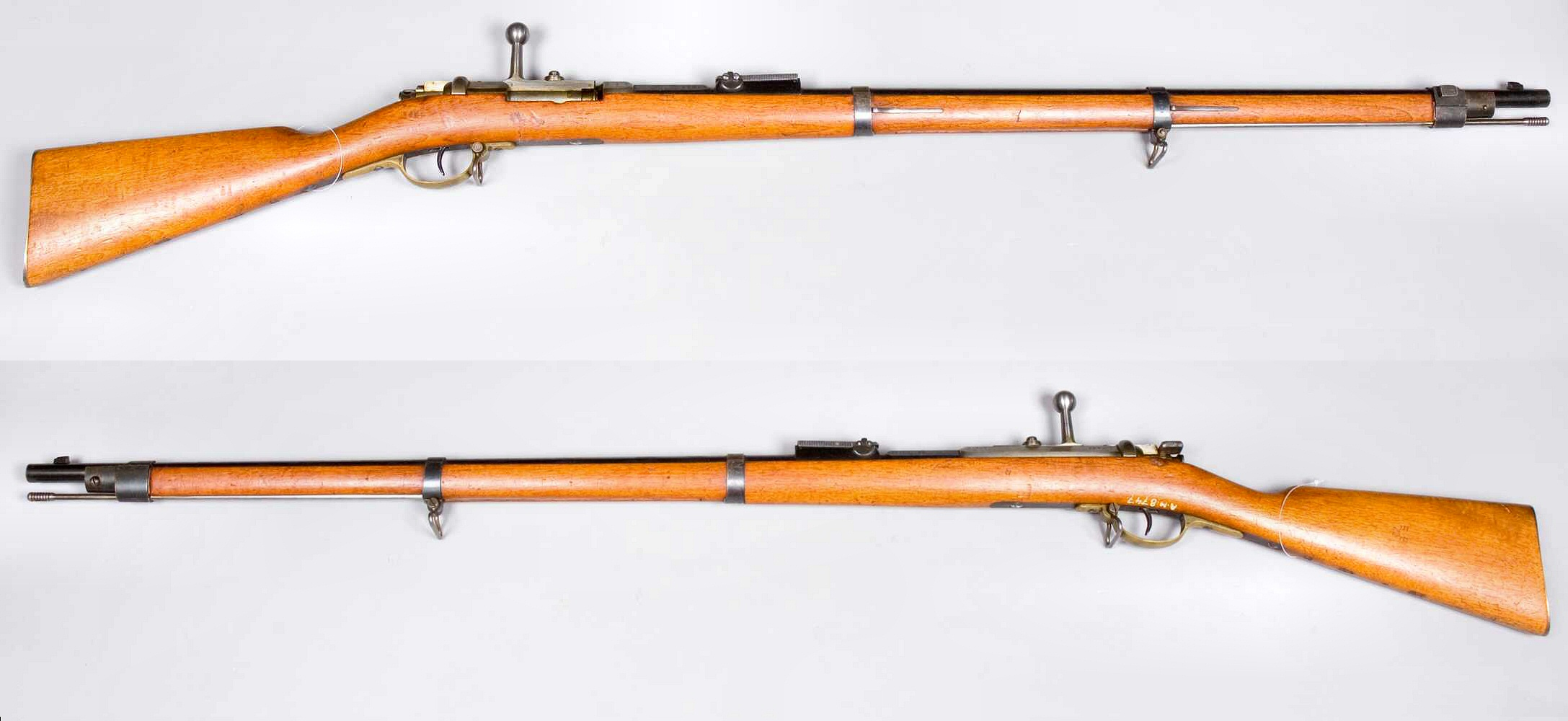
Mauser M1871

The Mauser Model 1871 adopted as the Gewehr 71 or Infanterie-Gewehr 71 ( I.G.Mod.71 first of many military rifles manufactured to the designs of Peter-Paul and Wilhelm Mauser of the Mauser company.

During 1870–71 trials with many different rifles took place; the M1869 Bavarian Werder was the Mauser's chief competitor. The Mauser was provisionally adopted at the end of 1871 pending the development of an appropriate safety. It was adopted by the German Empire, excluding Bavaria. The action was not based on its predecessor, the Dreyse needle gun, which had been in service for 30 years.

The Gewehr 71 is a conventional-looking bolt-action single-shot rifle that uses black powder cartridges. The action included only a bolt guide rib as its single locking lug, locking forward of the receiving bridge. The now well-recognized Mauser "wing"-type safety lever was developed for the Gewehr 71. The cartridge was a metallic 11 × 60R bottlenecked case, holding a charge of 77 grains (5.0 g) of black powder, capped with a 386-grain (25.0 g) round-tipped bullet.

=== Infanteriegewehr M71/84, Gew. 71/84 ===
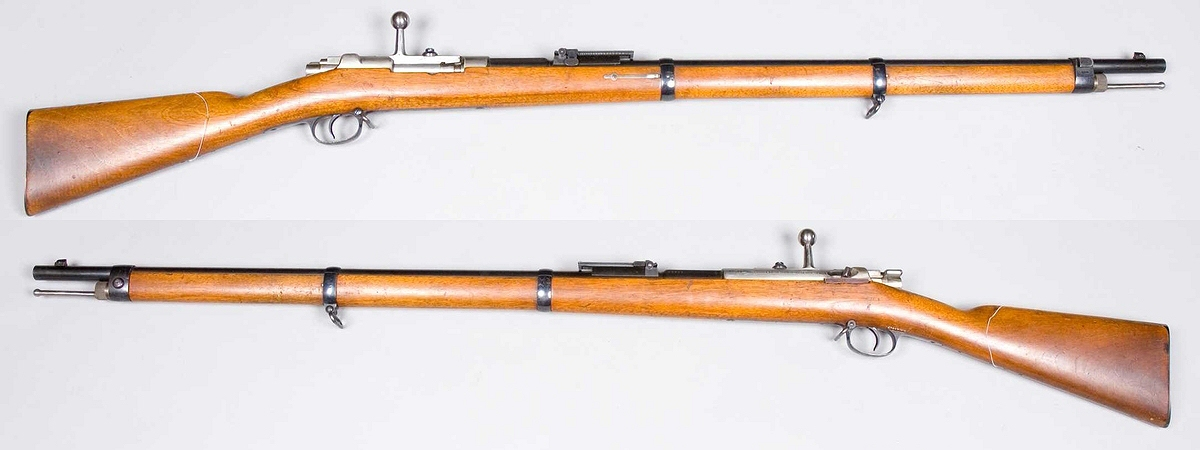
Mauser Model 1871/84

The Russo-Turkish War impressed upon European powers the importance of repeating rifles. The Mauser brothers had been improving the Gewehr 71 design while fulfilling contracts with Serbia. In 1881,Kaiser Wilhelm was impressed by a prototype of a Gewehr 71 that featured an eight-round tubular magazine under the barrel, which was loaded while the action was open. The bullet was slightly flattened, to reduce the chance of jamming or the detonation of primers in the tube.

There was a lever on the receiver that isolated the magazine, so that the rifle could be fired and loaded one shot at a time, keeping the magazine in reserve.

Production ended in 1890 after which time the arsenals had produced nearly 950,000 rifles; however by 1888 the introduction of the French Lebel using smokeless powder and smaller diameter high velocity bullets, made this weapon obsolete.

== Infanteriegewehr M88, Gewehr 88, Commission Rifle ==
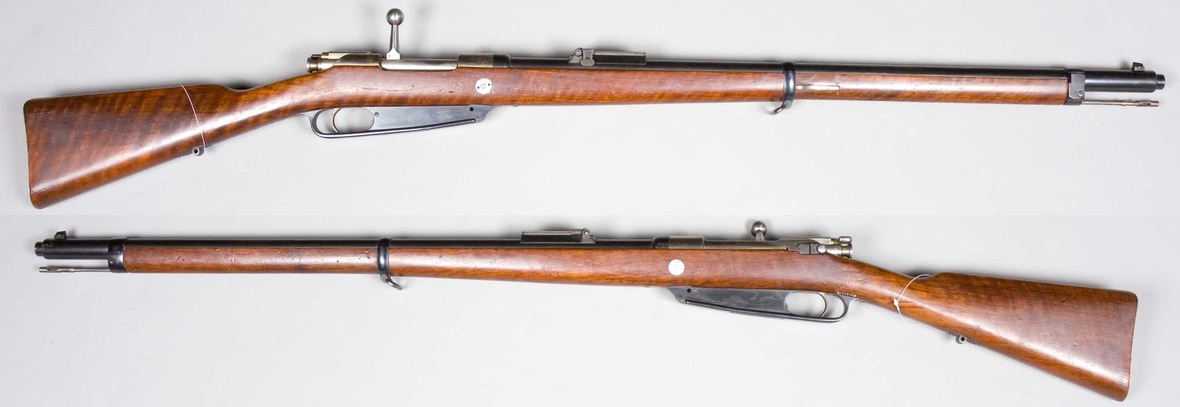
Gewehr 1888

The German Rifle Testing Commission initially tried to find a way to convert the many Gewehr 71/84 rifles into having a viable smokeless powder action; however the decision taken was to design a completely new weapon. The Commission chose not to involve or consult the Mausers. The result was the look of the Lebel, a Mauser-style action, Mannlicher magazine, a jacketed barrel, and a cartridge copied from the Swiss.

The Gewehr 88 was designed to use the 7.9mm × 57J cartridge, which is considerably smaller than the 11 mm round of the Gewehr 71.

A total of 1,675,000 Gewehr 88s were produced from 1889 to 1897.

== Infanteriegewehr M98, Gewehr 98 ==
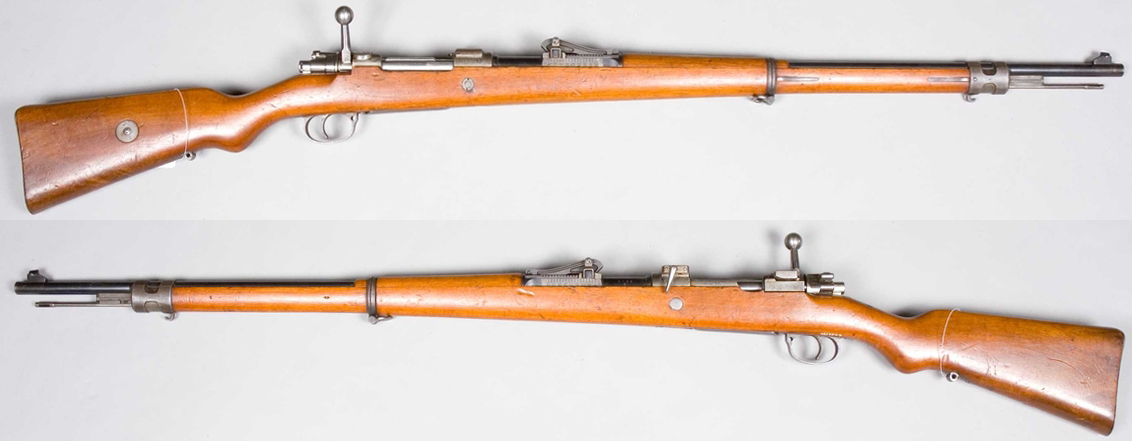
Mauser Gewehr 98

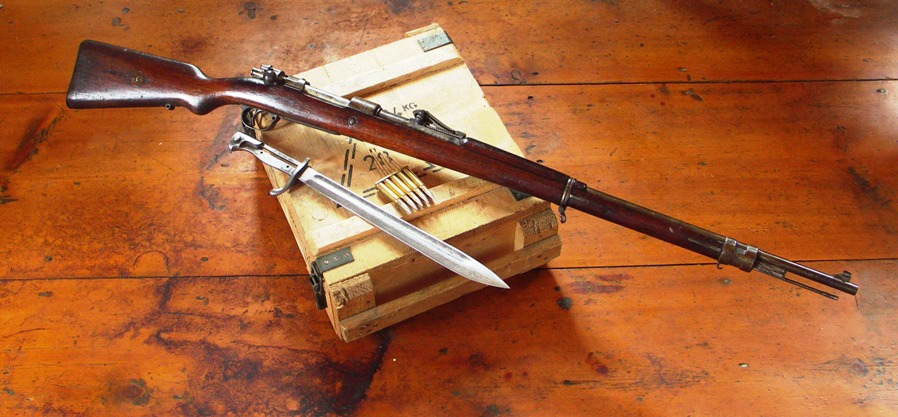
Mauser Model 98

Despite the choice of the Rifle Commission to not consult Paul Mauser in the late 1880s he kept developing better rifles and improved attributes for his firearms, which he sold to other countries. By the 1890s, his improved bolt design, the introduction of a stripper or charger clip loading configuration, and a fixed box magazine impressed Belgium, Turkey, and Argentina, enough for contracts to be signed.

Mauser went two steps further in 1892 when he again improved the bolt design by adding an extractor that prevented double feeding from the magazine and changed the single column box magazine to a staggered five cartridge box design. The magazine now fit in the rifle without any part of it protruding in front of the trigger making it less apt to be damaged while still easily and quickly loaded from the five round stripper clips. These improvements were embodied in the Model 1893 (adopted by Spain) and then slight improvements resulted in the 1895/96 model (adopted by Sweden, Mexico, Persia, and the Orange Free State).

In 1896 Mauser changed the firing pin distance facilitating faster lock time and accuracy; he also installed a cutout section in the left of the receiver, perfect for a thumb to fill while loading the ammunition from a charger/stripper clip. More impressively, he improved the bolt again by: 1), creating vector holes for gas from a ruptured primer; 2), a shrouded bolt head that protected the shooter from a ruptured cartridge; 3), the bolt head was designed to divert gas away from the face of the shooter; 4), a third bolt lug was added to keep the shooter safe if the two main bolt lugs should fail; and finally 5), a better designed extractor was added.

German troops were issued the rifle by 1899 and used them in the Boxer Rebellion of 1901. By 1912 the Gewehr 98 replaced all other rifles for the regular army and first line reserve troops.

In 1905 the Patrone S cartridge was adopted by the German army. Whereas the previous cartridge was 7.9mm × 57, a 227-grain (14.7 g) bullet that had a diameter of .318" and a round blunt end, this new cartridge, 7.92mm × 57, featured a 154-grain (10.0 g) bullet of the 'spitzer' (pointed) type. The diameter was .323", which required the re-barreling of previously issued rifles, including the Gewehr 98 and Gewehr 88.

== Early carbines ==
Mauser developed some carbine models in the early 20th century, the Kar98AZ, and several others. They were designed for the cavalry and other forces that needed a smaller weapon. Although it resembled a cut-down Gewehr 98, with a turned-down bolt it was ungainly and had an intense recoil. But by 1908 the Kar 98AZ was introduced, which was very popular with the German forces fighting in the trenches of World War I.

In post World War I Germany the government redesignated the Kar 98AZ to be the Kar 98a. This is because in 1923 the Reichswehr created another carbine by altering old Gewehr 98s. Designated the Kar. 98b, they were given a turned-down bolt, a side-mounted sling system, and a newer style of magazine follower. The rear sight was simplified from the large rear sight and altered to a more appropriate target range of 100–2,000 meters. The Kar 98b remained the same length as the Gewehr 98 but was still called a carbine.

== Karabiner 98K ==
The Karabiner 98k "Mauser" (often abbreviated "K98k" or "Kar98k") was adopted in the mid-1930s and would be the most common infantry rifle in service within the German Army during World War II. The design was developed from the Karabiner 98b, one of the carbines developed from the Model 1898 mentioned before. The K98k was first adopted by the Wehrmacht in 1935 to be their standard-issue rifle, with many older versions being converted and shortened as well as the design itself entering production.

In the name K98k, the first "K" stands for karabiner (carbine) and the second "k" for kurz (short). The "98" is derived from the earlier rifle's year of adoption (1898), although the carbine itself was adopted in 1935. The K98k is often confused as being the earlier Model 98 design; however, there are notable differences between them. The easiest to spot are its shorter length, and bent, rather than straight bolt handle. Less obvious are that it has different, simpler sights. It was intended to be a "universal rifle" for all parts of the Heer rather than having both Carbine and full length versions.

The weapon has a bolt-action and uses 7.92×57mm ammunition (referred to as 8mm Mauser). It has an effective range of about 800 metres, but when fitted with a high-quality rifle scope, its range increases to 1,000 metres. The K98k has a five-round internal magazine and is loaded from a five-round stripper clip that is inserted into a slot in front of the opened bolt and pushed into the magazine with the thumb. The empty stripper clip is then ejected from the gun when the bolt is pushed forward into position. A trench magazine was also produced that could be attached to the bottom of the internal magazine by removing the floor plate, increasing capacity to 20 rounds, although it still required loading with the clips. Over 14 million of these rifles were produced by various manufacturers. However, this number includes versions of the weapon other than the K98k, such as the Czech vz-24. From 1950 to 1965, Yugoslavia produced a near-carbon copy of the K98k called the Model 1948, which differed only from the German rifle in that it had the shorter bolt-action of the Model 1924 series of Mauser rifles. In addition, in 1943, the Spaniards were manufacturing a slightly modified version, but with a straight bolt handle.

== Gewehr 41 ==
Gewehr 41(W)

By 1940, it became apparent that some form of a semi-automatic rifle, with a higher rate of fire than existing bolt-action models, was necessary to improve the infantry's combat efficiency. The Wehrmacht issued a specification to various manufacturers, and both Mauser and Walther submitted prototypes that were very similar.

The Mauser design, the G41(M), failed. Only 6,673 were produced before production was halted, and of these, 1,673 were returned as unusable. The Walther design, the G41(W), is in outward appearance not unlike the Gewehr 43 (see below). Most metal parts on this rifle were machined steel, and some rifles, especially later examples utilized bakelite type plastic handguards. The Walther design was more successful because the designers had simply neglected the last two restrictions listed in the main article.

These rifles, along with their G41(M) counterparts, suffered from gas system fouling defects. These problems seemed to stem from the overly complex muzzle trap system becoming excessively corroded from the use of corrosive salts in the ammunition primers, and carbon fouling. The muzzle assembly consisted of many fine parts and was difficult to disassemble, keep clean, and maintain in field conditions.

G41(W) rifles were produced at two factories, namely Walther at Zella Mehlis and Berlin-Lübecker. Varying sources put production figures between 40,000 and 145,000 units. These rifles saw a high attrition rate on the Eastern front.

== Gewehr 43 ==
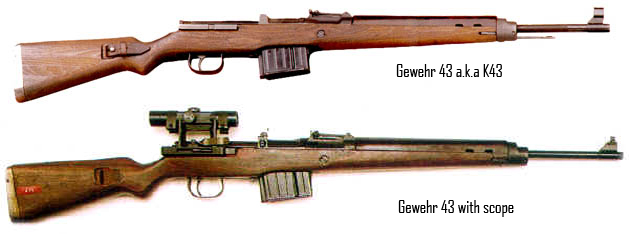
G43

In 1941, Nazi Germany invaded the Soviet Union as part of Operation Barbarossa. Just prior to the opening of hostilities, the Red Army had started re-arming its infantry, replacing its older bolt-action rifles with the new semi-automatic Tokarev SVT38 and SVT40. This proved to be something of a shock to the Germans, who ramped up their semi-automatic rifle development efforts significantly.

The Tokarev used a simple gas-operated mechanism, which was soon emulated by Walther, thus producing the Gewehr 43 (or 'G43') from the handicapped G41. The simpler mechanism of the G43 made it lighter, easier to mass-produce, and far more reliable. The addition of a 10-round detachable box magazine also solved the slow reloading problem. The Gewehr 43 was put into production in October 1943, and followed in 1944 by the Karabiner 43 ('K43'), which was identical to the G43 in every way save for the letter stamped on the side. The G/K43 was issued in limited numbers in 1944 and 1945 to units of the Wehrmacht.

Total production by the end of the war was 402,713 of both models, including at least 53,435 sniper rifles fitted with the Zielfernrohr 43 ('ZF 4') scope with 4x magnification. The weapon was originally designed for use with the Schiessbecher device for firing rifle grenades (standard on the Kar 98k as well) and the Schalldämpfer suppressor. However these accessories were deemed unsuccessful in tests and were dropped even before the rifle entered serial production. It was also not equipped to use a bayonet. The Gewehr 43 stayed in service with the Czechoslovak army for several years after the war.

== Sturmgewehr ==
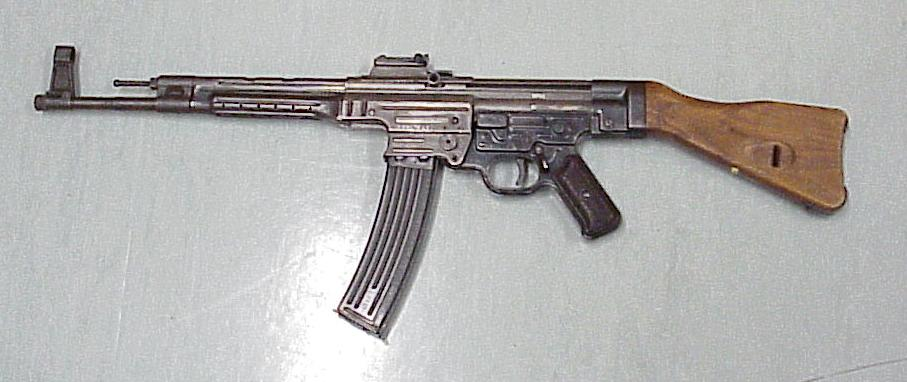
Sturmgewehr 44 (assault rifle)

Developed in Nazi Germany during World War II, the Sturmgewehr was a series of assault rifles that were the first to see major deployment. It is also known by the designations: Maschinenpistole 43, Maschinenpistole 44 (MP43 and MP44, respectively), which denotes earlier versions of the same weapon.

MP43, MP44, and StG44 were different names for what was essentially the same rifle, with minor differences in production and dates. The various names were a result of the complicated small arms nomenclature in Nazi Germany. Developed from the Mkb 42(H) "machine carbine", the 'StG44' combined traits of carbines, submachine guns and automatic rifles. StG is an abbreviation of Sturmgewehr. The name was chosen for propaganda reasons and means "assault rifle" as in "to assault a bunker". After the adoption of the StG44, the English translation 'assault rifle' became a common class description of this type of infantry small arm.

The rifle was chambered for the 7.92×33mm cartridge, also known as 7.92mm Kurz (German for "short"). This shorter version of the German standard (7.92×57mm) rifle round, in combination with the weapon's selective-fire design, provided most of the controllable firepower of a submachine gun at close quarters with much of the accuracy and power of a Karabiner 98k bolt-action rifle at intermediate ranges. While the StG44 had less range and power than the more powerful infantry rifles of the day, Wehrmacht studies had shown that most combat engagements occurred at less than 300 meters with the majority within 200 meters.

=== MKb 42 ===
Contracts for rifles firing the Kurz round were sent to both Walther and Haenel (whose design group was headed by Hugo Schmeisser), they were asked to submit prototype weapons under the name Maschinenkarabiner 1942 (MKb 42, literally "machine carbine"). Both designs were similar, using a gas-operated action, with both semi-automatic and fully automatic firing modes.

While the new version was under development in late 1942, infighting within the Third Reich was in full swing. Adolf Hitler was increasingly concerned with this, and after Hermann Göring had created the FG 42 (Fallschirmjägergewehr or Paratrooper Rifle) in a separate program from the army's similar Gewehr 41 efforts, Hitler cancelled all new rifle projects completely. This included the production of the MKb 42(H). One concern was that the new weapon used a new ammunition type that would further hamper an already daunting logistics problem.

=== MP43 ===
In order to preserve the weapons development, a new project at Gustloff was started to produce a similar weapon using the original Mauser round, the Mkb 43(G). Whenever Hitler asked about the progress of the rifle, he was always shown one of these prototypes, although there was no intention of producing them. Meanwhile, the newest version of the original Mkb 42(H) was called the Maschinenpistole 43 (MP43) to disguise it as an upgrade to existing submachine guns. Another change fit a rifle grenade launcher attachment from the earlier MKb 42(H) to the MP43/1.

Eventually the truth surfaced and Hitler ordered the project stopped once again. However, in March 1943 he allowed the run to continue for evaluation purposes, which then continued until September, and due to the positive combat reports it was allowed to continue.

=== MP44 and StG44 ===
On 6 April 1944, Hitler issued the following decree:

1. The former MG42 is to retain the same designation
2. The former self-loading rifle, known as the Gewehr 43, shall receive the designation Karabiner 43 (K43).
3. The former new MP, known as the MP43, shall receive the designation StG44 (Sturmgewehr 44).

In July 1944 at a meeting of the various army heads about the Eastern Front, when Hitler asked what they needed, a general blurted out "More of these new rifles!" This caused some confusion, but once Hitler was given a chance to test fire the MP44, he was impressed and gave it the title Sturmgewehr. Seeing the possibility of a propaganda coup, the rifle was again renamed the StG44, to highlight the new class of weapon it represented, translated, it means "assault rifle, model 1944", thereby introducing the term.

By the end of the war, some 425,977 StG44 variants of all types were produced. The assault rifle proved a valuable weapon, especially on the Eastern Front, where it was first deployed. A properly trained soldier with an StG44 had an improved tactical repertoire, in that he could effectively engage targets at longer ranges than with an MP40, but be much more useful than the Kar 98k in close combat, as well as provide light cover fire like a light machine gun.

== Karabiner S (East Germany) ==
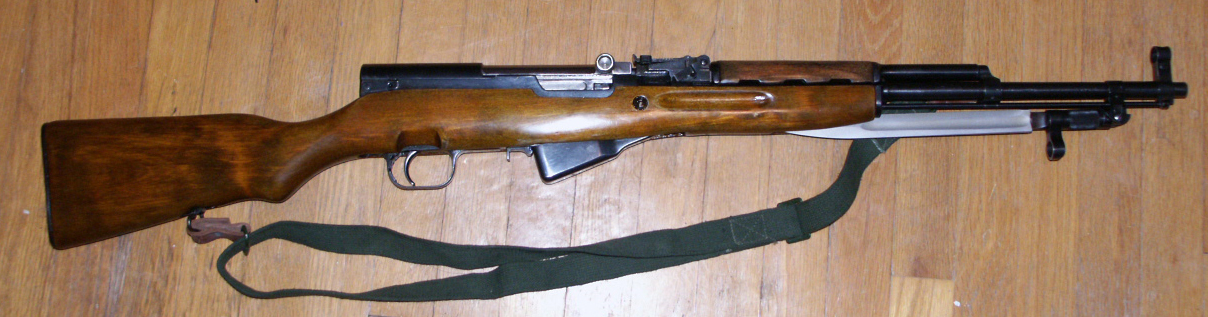
Karabiner S (SKS)

The Karabiner S is a German manufactured Russian SKS semi-automatic carbine, which was designed in 1945 by Sergei Gavrilovich Simonov. It is formally known as the Samozaryadniy Karabin sistemi Simonova (Russian: Самозарядный карабин системы Симонова), 1945 (Self-loading Carbine, Simonov's system, 1945), or SKS 45. It was originally planned to serve as the standard-issue weapon for the Soviet military forces, alongside the new AK-47. As mass production of AK-pattern rifles increased, the SKS carbine was soon phased out of service. It was quickly replaced entirely by the AK-47, but it remained in second-line service for decades afterwards.

== MPi-K (East Germany) ==
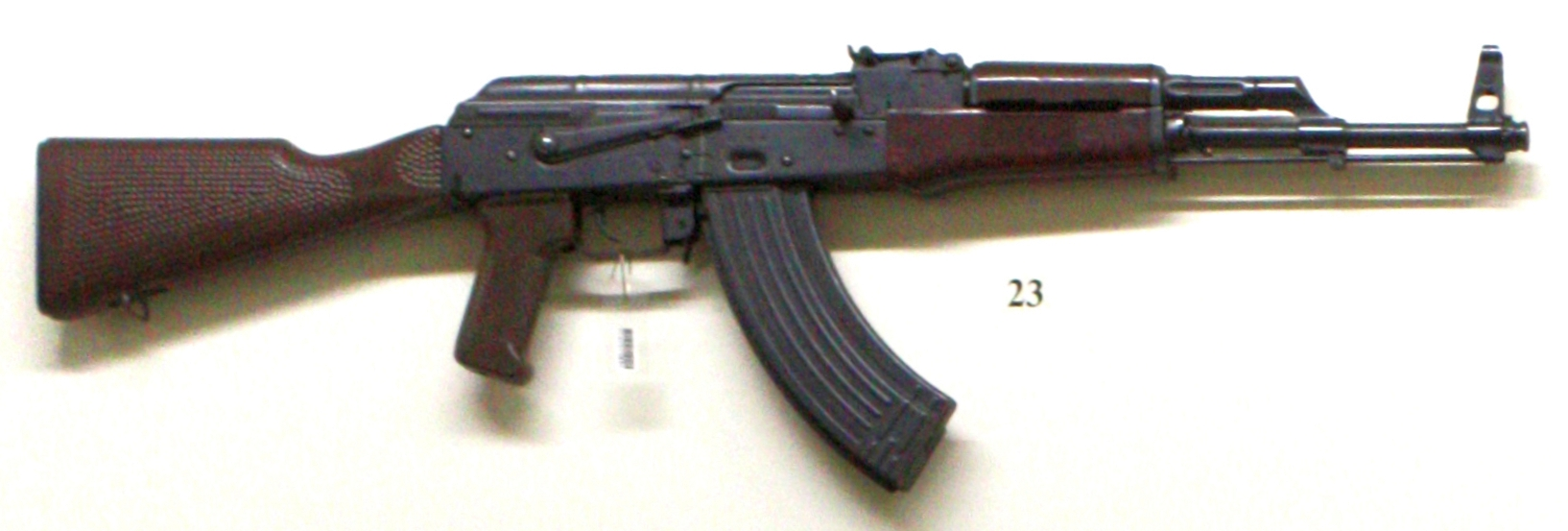
MPi-KM-72

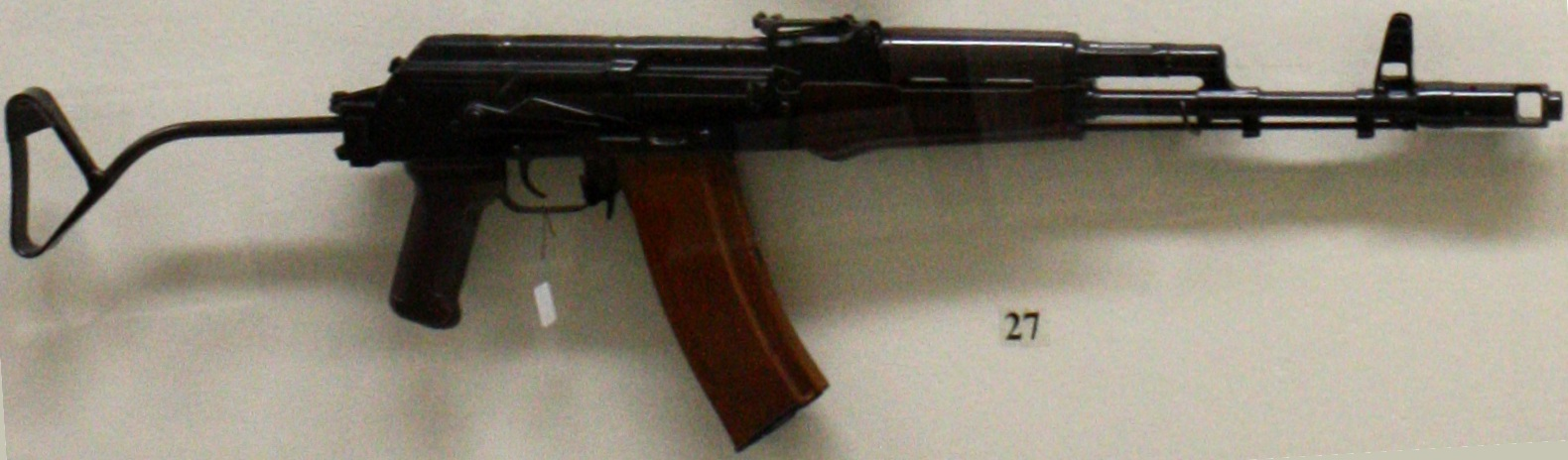
MPi-KMS-74

The AK-47 is a gas-operated assault rifle used in most Eastern bloc countries including East Germany during the Cold War. Adopted and standardized in 1947, it was designed by Mikhail Kalashnikov and originally produced by Russian manufacturer Izhmash. Compared with most auto-loading rifles of World War II, the AK-47 is compact, of comparable range, moderate power, and capable of selective fire. It was one of the first true assault rifles and remains the most widely used, known as the "Best Automatic Assault Rifle". More AK-type rifles have been produced than of any other assault rifle type.

East German AK copies served with the National People's Army throughout its existence. The MPi-K and MPi-KS were derived from the original AK-47 and AKS, the MPi-KM, MPi-KMS-72 and MPi-KMS-K were derived from the AKM and AKMS, and the MPi-AK-74N, MPi-AKS-74N, and MPi-AKS-74NK, were derived from the AK-74 and AKS-74.

== StG-940 (East Germany) ==
The StG-940 was procured in 1985 for testing as a possible replacement for the MPi-AK-74N rifle (AK-74). It was designated the Sturmgewehr 940 ("Assault Rifle 940"), or StG-940. It was cancelled with the end of the Cold War in 1989.

== G1 – FN FAL (West Germany) ==
G1 battle rifle

The first German FALs were from an order placed in late 1955/early 1956, for several thousand FN FAL so-called "Canada" models with wooden furniture and the prong flashhider. These weapons were intended for the Bundesgrenzschutz (border guard) and not the nascent Bundeswehr (armed forces), which at the time used M1 Garands and M1/M2 carbines.

In November 1956 West Germany ordered 100,000 additional FALs, designated the G1, for the army. The G1 is distinguished from other FAL weapons by a pressed metal handguard with horizontal lines running almost the entire length, and a unique removable prong flash hider.

G1s served in Germany for a relatively short time in the late 1950s and early 1960s. They were replaced in 1959 by the Heckler & Koch G3, based on the Spanish CETME Modelo 58, partly because the Belgians would not grant a license for production of the G1 in Germany. Many G1 FALs were passed on to Turkey after the weapon's withdrawal from German service.

== G2 – SIG SG 510 (West Germany) ==
The SG 510 was procured in 1956 for testing as a possible replacement for the G1 rifle (FN FAL). It was designated the Gewehr 2 ("Rifle No.2") or G2. It lost out to a modified version of the CETME rifle by Heckler & Koch designated the G3.

== Heckler & Koch G3 (West Germany) ==
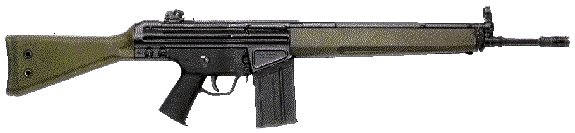
H&K G3A3

The G3 (which stands for Gewehr 3, or Rifle No. 3) is a family of select fire battle rifles manufactured by Heckler & Koch. It was adopted as the standard service rifle by the Bundeswehr in 1959 as a replacement for the G1, a modified version of the Belgian FN FAL, and served until 1997 when it was replaced by the G36. The G3 was chambered for the 7.62×51mm NATO cartridge.

=== Development ===
After World War II the Spanish state arms company CETME (founded 1949) employed the German arms designer Ludwig Vorgrimler. Vorgrimler had worked for Mauser before and during the war, and was the designer of the experimental German assault rifle known as "Gerät 06" or Stg.45(M). The design evolved into the CETME rifle, later adopted in 1958 by the Spanish Army as the Assault Rifle Model 58.

In 1956 the German Army bought 400 CETME rifles. After extensive testing, they requested numerous changes in the CETME design. After these were incorporated, Heckler & Koch obtained a license for further production.

The G3 rifle has been widely praised for its relatively compact size and sturdy stamped steel construction, which also enabled lower production costs compared to many other 7.62 mm NATO rifles. Heavy weight and stiff trigger pull have been cited as the weapon's chief disadvantages, along with a rather sharp recoil and less-than-ideal pointing and handling characteristics.

=== Variants of the G3 ===
The G3 has served as the basis for a wide variety of other H&K firearms, including weapons in different calibers and various sniper rifles. The HK 33 and G41 are related firearms, and are essentially a G3 scaled down to 5.56×45mm NATO.

The G3 and its variants have been used by the armed forces and police in a wide variety of countries. As a result, it has seen use in a number of conflicts during the late 20th century. Its first known combat use was by Portuguese Armed Forces during their war in Africa. Portuguese forces were unable to carry large quantities of heavy 7.62 mm NATO ammunition on long patrols, the resulting lack of firepower was occasionally a handicap when encountering enemy forces equipped with the AK-47. G3 rifles also saw action with the West German police during the failed rescue attempt of Israeli athletes at the 1972 Olympics in Munich. The situation prompted development of the PSG-1 sniper rifle (substantially derived from the G3).

== G4 – Armalite AR-10 (West Germany) ==
The AR-10 was procured in 1958 for testing as a possible replacement for the G1 rifle (FN FAL). It was designated the Gewehr 4 ("Rifle No.4"), or G4. It lost out to a modified version of the CETME rifle by Heckler & Koch designated the G3.

== Heckler & Koch G11 (West Germany) ==
Heckler & Koch started designing the G11 in the 1970s, when the Bundeswehr asked them to develop a new weapon system to replace the 1950s vintage 7.62 × 51 mm G3 rifle. It was to be used by commandos and special forces. It was cancelled when the Cold War ended in 1989.

== Heckler & Koch G41 (West Germany) ==
Heckler & Koch also began designing the G41 in the 1970s, when the Bundeswehr asked them to develop a new weapon system to replace the 1950s vintage 7.62×51mm G3 rifle. It was an update of the HK33 designed to use NATO STANAG accessories. It too was cancelled when the Cold War ended in 1989.

== Heckler & Koch G36 (Germany) ==
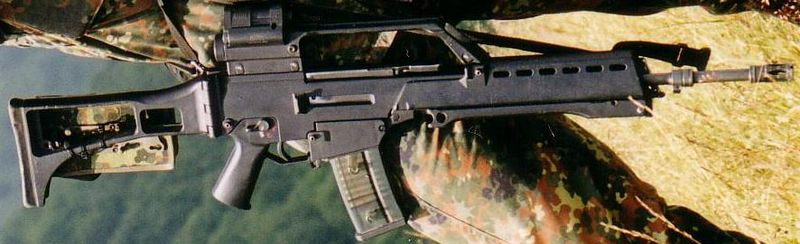
H&K G36

The 'G36' (company designation, Bundeswehr designation Gewehr G36) is an assault rifle designed in the early 1990s and manufactured in Germany by Heckler & Koch. It is the current service rifle of the German and the Spanish Armed Forces among others. A family of variants exists, many of which have been adopted by police or military forces. The G36 replaced the G3 as the main infantry weapon of the Bundeswehr in 1997, a process that is now considered complete.

Heckler & Koch started designing the G36 in 1990. The Bundeswehr needed a replacement for the 1950s vintage G3 that would be cheaper than the proposed G41 and G11. Two earlier Heckler and Koch designs, the revolutionary G11 (it was designed to fire caseless ammunition) and the more conventional G41, were both rejected in 1989 due to the end of the Cold War.

== Heckler & Koch HK416 ==
On September 15, 2020, the Bundeswehr initially selected the Haenel MK 556 to replace the HK G36 as their new service rifle, but after alleged irregularities in the selection process an investigation was launched. The BAAINBw concluded in 2021 that "The rifle offered by Haenel infringed the patents of other businesses", which resulted in their exclusion from the procurement procedure. As the competing offer from H&K was not excluded so far and was deemed by now as "more economically advantageous" the contract was awarded to Heckler & Koch in favor of the HK416 A8.

== See also ==
- British military rifles
