= Podewils gun =

19th-century rifle of the Bavarian army

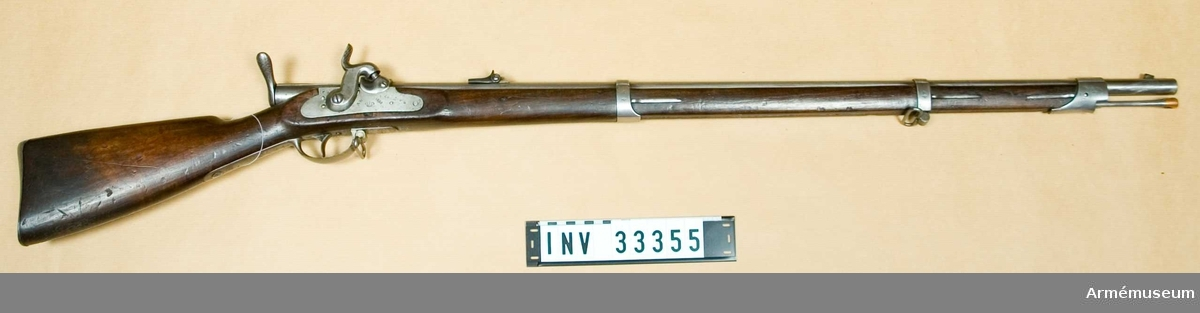
Bavarian breechloading rifle M1858/67, Lindner-Braun conversion.

The Podewils rifle-musket was a 13.9mm calibre rifle used in the Bavarian army since 1858. It was the most common infantry weapon of the Bavarian army in the Austro-Prussian War of 1866 and the Franco-Prussian War of 1870/71. Theodor Fontane called it an "excellent" weapon of the Austro-Prussian war due to its long range. Originally a muzzleloader, it was converted to breechloading in 1867, the so-called Lindner conversion. In 1869, the Bavarian army started to replace it with the Werder breechloader, but due to budgetary constrains by 1870 most Bavarian troops still used the Podewils while only four infantry battalions had received the Werder (primarily Jäger units). Even the Lindner conversion was inferior to both the Prussian Dreyse needle gun and the French Chassepot.

== See also ==
- Green percussion rifle, a Serbian conversion of Austrian Lorenz M1854, similar in appearance and action.
