= Wänzl rifle =

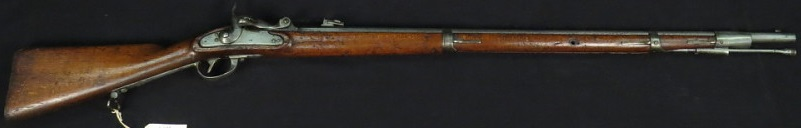
- A rifle on display at the Smithsonian Institution
- Type: Breech-loading rifle
- Place of origin: Austrian Empire

Service history
- In service: 1867–1918
- Used by: Austrian Empire; Qing Empire; Australia (captured); Japan; Orange Free State; Kingdom of Dahomey
- Wars: Boshin War; First Boer War; 1882 Herzegovina uprising Boxer Rebellion; Balkan Wars; World War I (rear echelon troops)

Production history
- Designer: Franz Wänzel
- Manufacturer: Steyr
- Produced: 1867–1869
- No. built: 70,000–120,000
- Variants: Wänzel Infanterie Gewehr M1854/67; Wänzel Infanterie Gewehr M1862/67; Wänzel JägerStutzen M1854/67; Wänzel JägerStutzen M1862/67; Wänzel Extra-Corps Gewehr M1854/67; Wänzel Extra-Corps Gewehr M1862/67; Wänzel WallGewehr M1872

Specifications
- Length: 41.4 in (1,050 mm) to 52.6 in (1,340 mm)
- Cartridge: 13.9×33mmR
- Action: Front-hinged trapdoor
- Feed system: Single-shot

The Wänzl or Wänzel rifle was a breech-loading conversion of the Lorenz M1854 and M1862 rifles, adopted in 1866, shortly after the Austrian Empire was defeated in the Austro-Prussian War, as an interim measure before a design by Josef Werndl was formally approved the next year.

== History ==
Prior to the Austrian-Prussian War of 1866, the Imperial Austrian Army was armed with the muzzleloader Lorenz rifle, a sturdy and accurate weapon, though Austrian reliance on bayonet charges at the expense of marksmanship training negatively affected its effectiveness. While private gunmakers such as Josef Werndl of Steyr were ready to provide the Army with breechloaders, they weren't adopted due to several factors: the Vienna Arsenal was already pressed to increase production of Lorenz rifles and switching production to a new design would require a costly retooling; the average recruit was too unskilled to handle even the simpler Lorenz; and the military refused to give up their arms manufacturing monopoly, though Army trials with domestic and foreign breechloaders were conducted in the spring of 1866.

Faced with heavy casualties against the Prussian infantry, armed with the quick-firing breechloading Model 1862 Zündnadelgewehr Dreyse, the Austrians attempted to counter the firepower of the Dreyse with the greater range of their artillery and the Lorenz rifle, and in the last months of the war, they procured a shipment of 5,000 Remington rolling block rifles from Belgium, but by the time the shipment arrived, the war with Prussia had already ended.

Months after their defeat, Archduke Albrecht demanded the infantry to be immediately re-equipped. According to author Mike Bennighof, the Archduke sought to deflect the blame from the Army's shortcomings in leadership, training, and tactics to its technology. Subsequently the Austrians began working on converting their old stocks of Lorenz rifles before adopting the Werndl–Holub rifle in 1867. The Austrians initially considered adopting a needle gun design in order to make use of the readily available stocks of paper cartridges used in the Lorenz, but eventually the Army decided on a metallic cartridge for their new rifles.

The locally designed Wänzl breech was chosen over the Belgian Albini-Braendlin, the British Snider and others, and officially adopted in January 1867.

Bennighof stated that 70,000 rifles and carbines were converted in total with 80,000 planned, while author John Walter estimated that around 120,000 guns were converted by Steyr in 1867–1869.

== Design ==
The rifle is a lifting-block breechloader chambered for the 13.9×33mmR rimfire cartridge and the barrels are either made of wrought iron or steel depending on the converted Lorenz model: The Model 1854 used iron barrels while steel was used on the Model 1862, which also features smaller lock plates.

All rifles feature a folding leaf sight graduated from 500–1200 paces depending on the model. Author Andrew Wheatcroft describes the Wänzl as a "simple, if uninspired," conversion that was chosen for being inexpensive and a national design.

== Gallery ==
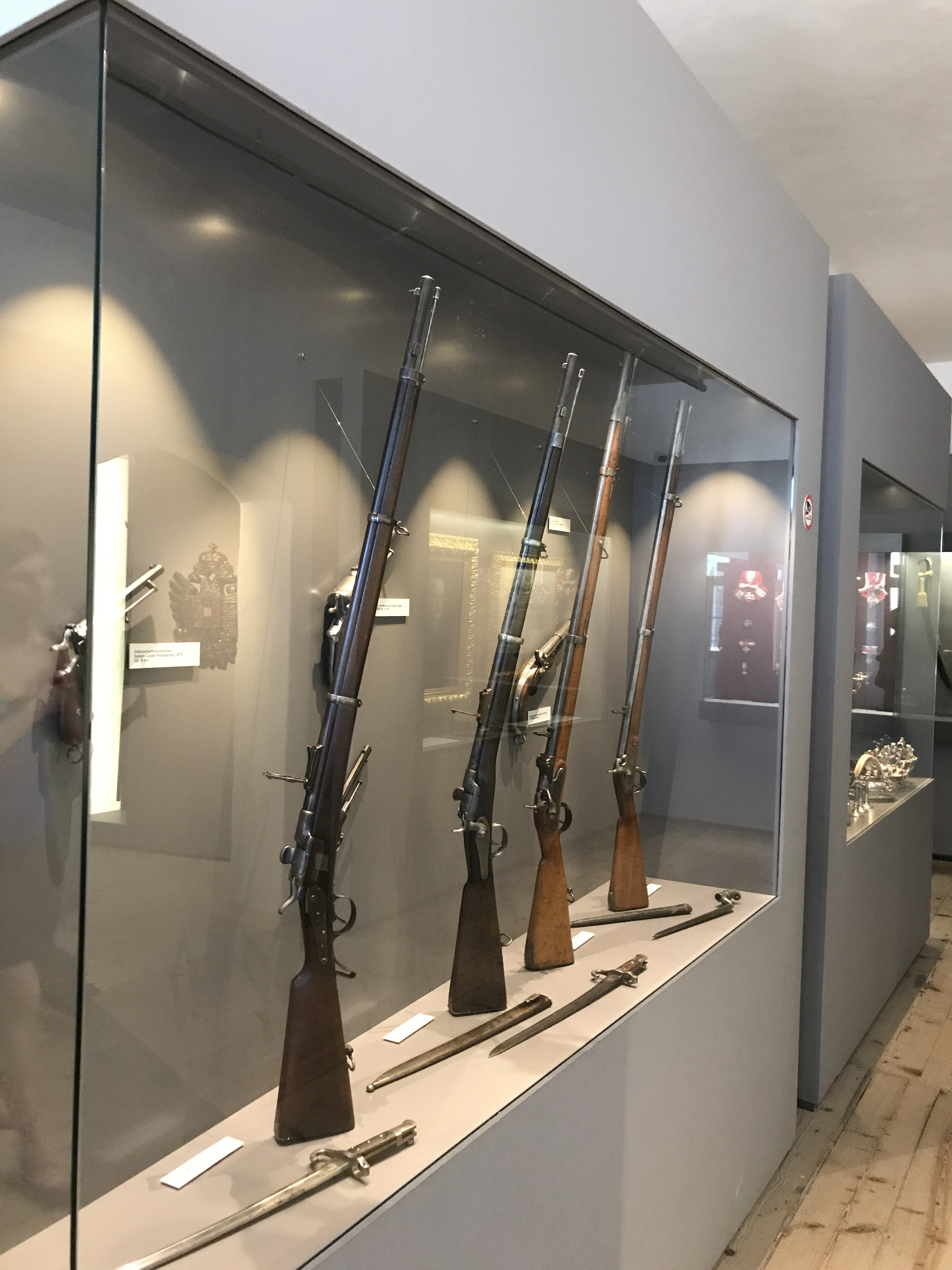
Wänzl variants on display at Fortress Hohensalzburg, Austria

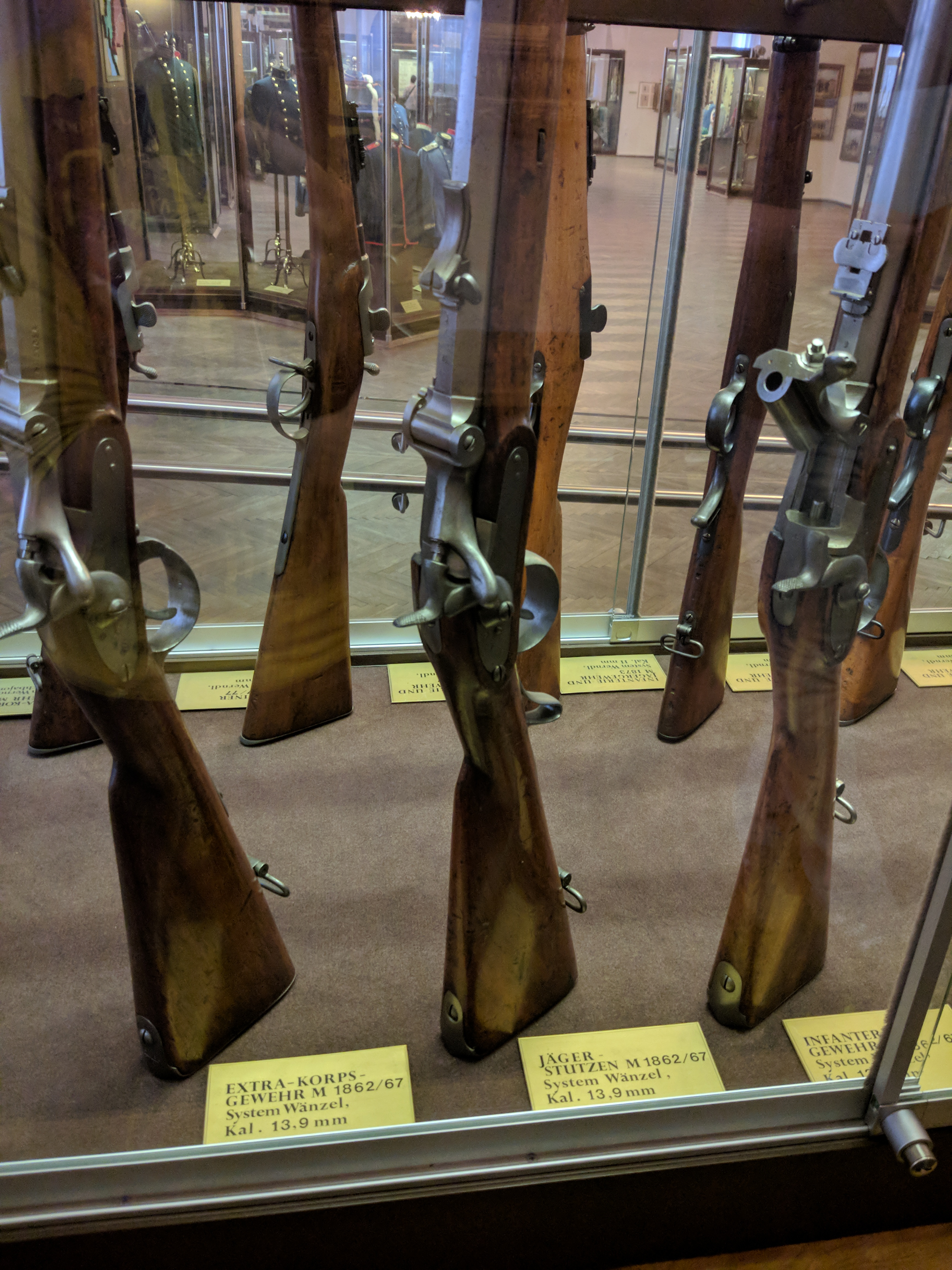
The Wänzl breech mechanism

A Wänzl carbine on display at the Royal Ontario Museum, Canada

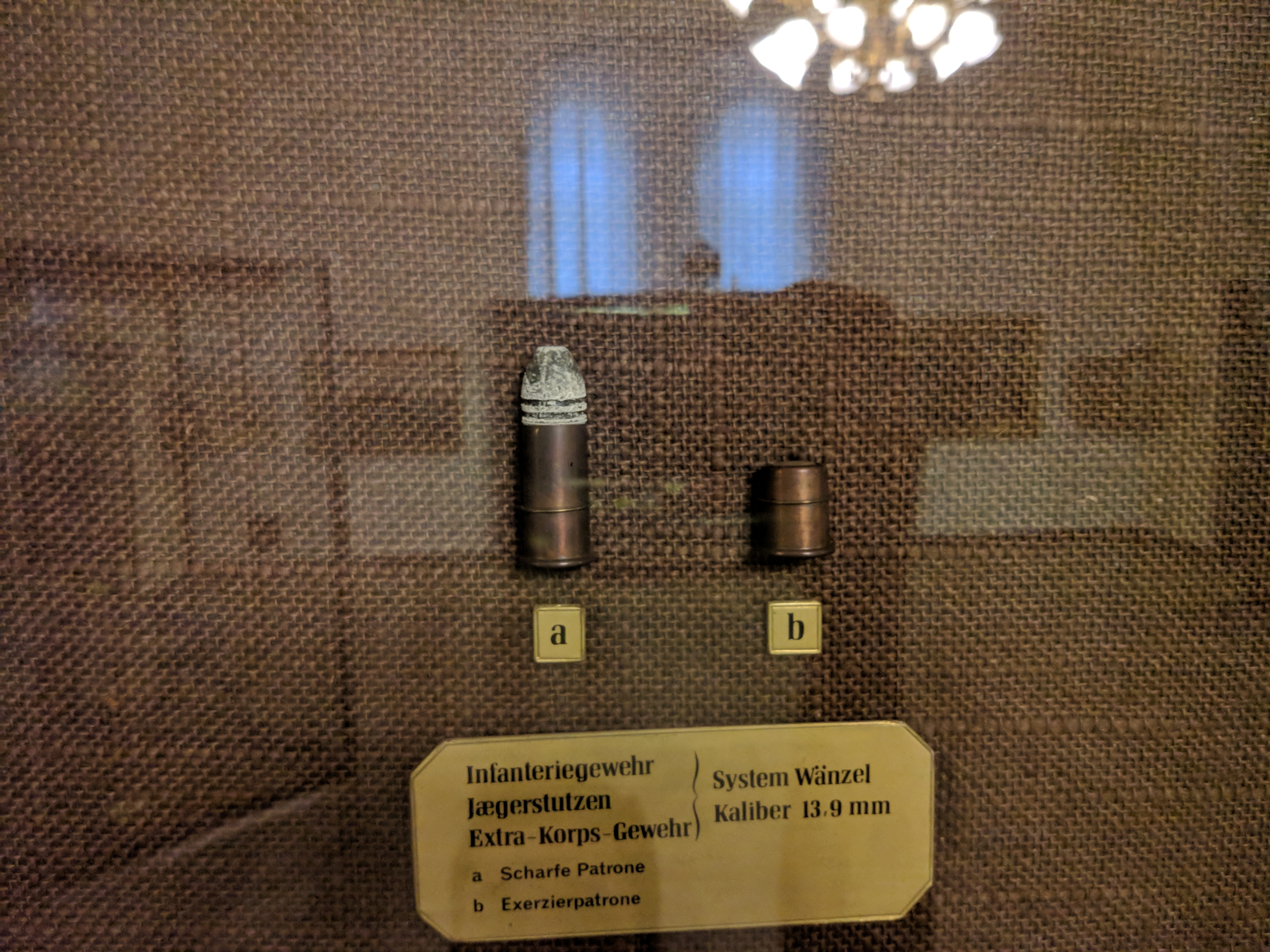
13.9 mm cartridges on display

== See also ==
- Albini-Braendlin rifle
- Snider-Enfield rifle
- Springfield model 1873
- Tabatière rifle
- Green M1867, a Serbian conversion of Lorenz M1854
- Weaponry of the Austro-Hungarian Empire
