= Jacob Snider =

American inventor (1811-1866)

- Born: Jacob Snider; January 1, 1811; Montgomery, Georgia
- Died: October 25, 1866 (aged 55); 11, Oxford Road, Kilburn, London, England
- Occupation: Inventor
- Spouse: Angelina

Jacob Snider (January 1, 1811 – October 25, 1866) was an American wine merchant and inventor. He co-invented and patented a method of converting existing muzzle-loading rifles into breech-loading rifles, notably the Snider-Enfield.

Originally from Montgomery, Georgia, Snider later moved to Philadelphia, but died in poverty in Kilburn, London, England while attempting to recover promised compensation from the British government. He was survived by his wife Angelina and several sons, and is buried in Kensal Green Cemetery, London.

Snider worked for the Pennsylvania Institute for the Blind, and in 1833, he produced the first raised print book in the United States. His method, which involved carving the letters into a sheet of copper by hand, was soon abandoned.
