= Peabody action =

Breechloading firearm action

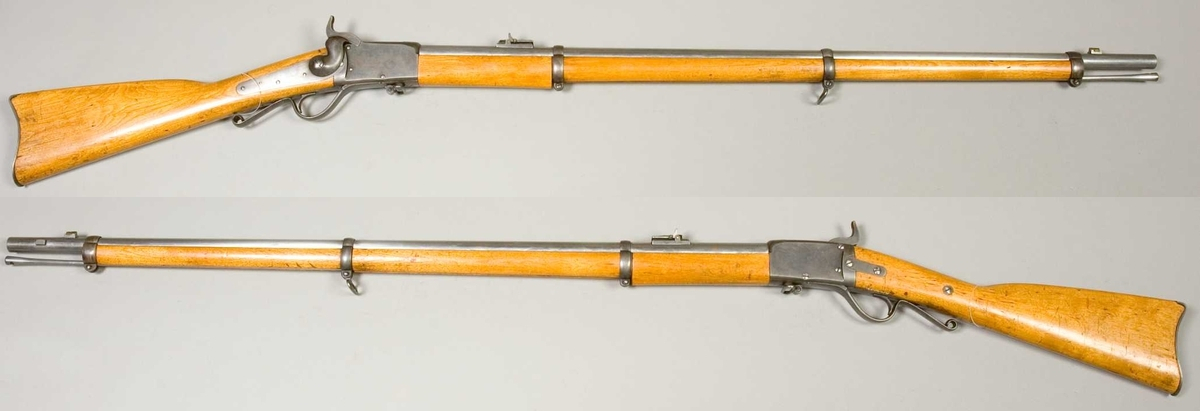
Peabody rifle from the collection of Armémuseum, the Swedish Army Museum. This rifle took part in the 1866 Norwegian-Swedish rifle trials.

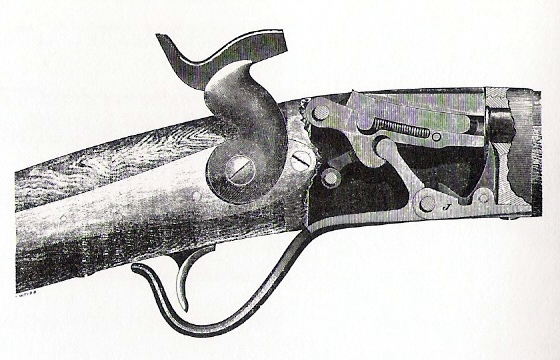
Peabody action

The Peabody action was an early form of breechloading firearm action, where the heavy breechblock tilted downwards across a bolt mounted in the rear of the breechblock, operated by a lever under the rifle. The Peabody action most often used an external hammer to fire the cartridge.

== History ==
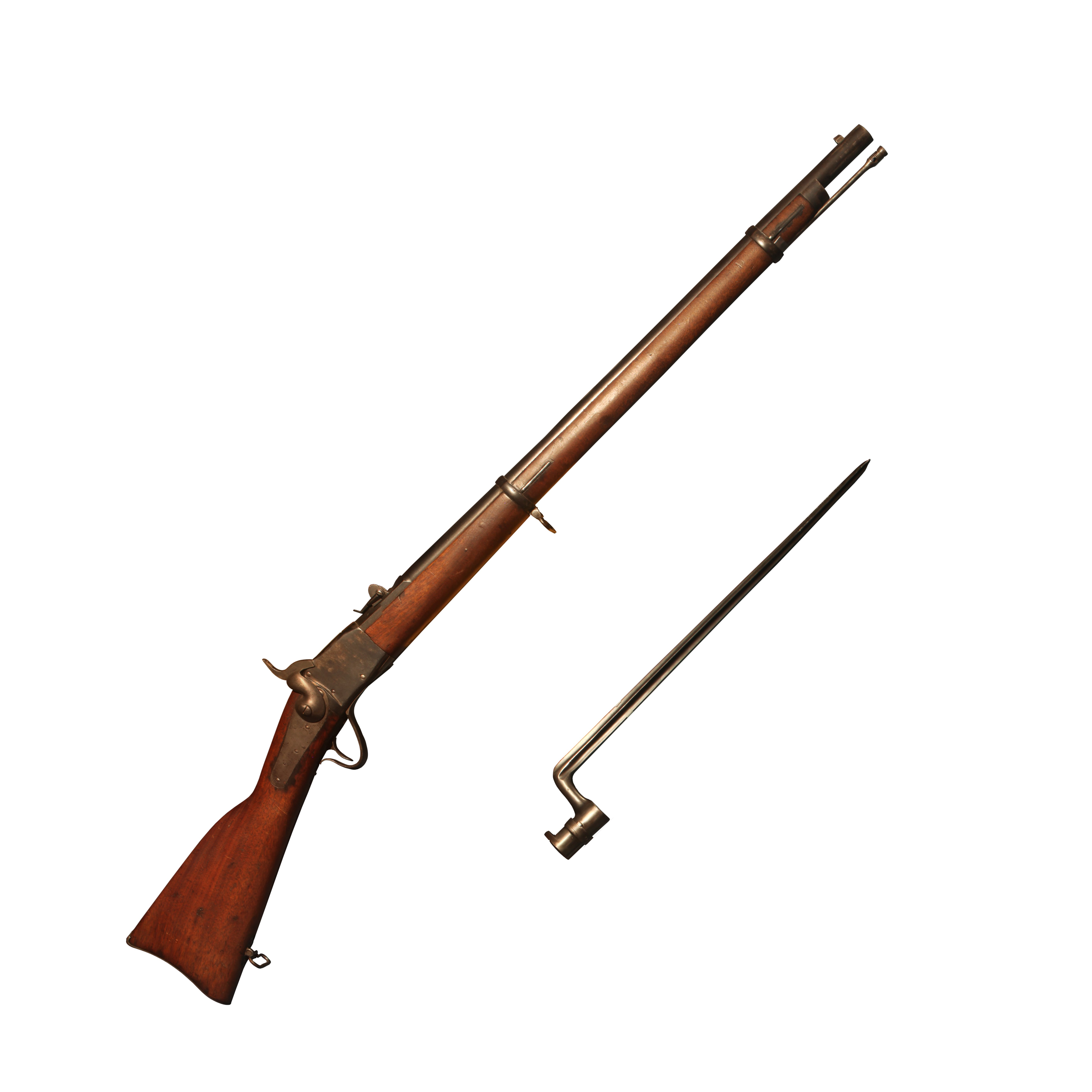
Peabody rifle, model 1867, cal .41 (10.4 mm) Swiss. On display at Musée Militaire Vaudois, 1110 Morges, Switzerland.

=== Original Peabody action ===
The Peabody action was developed by Henry Oliver Peabody (13 May 1826 Boxford, Massachusetts – 28 June 1903 Hull, Massachusetts) from Boston, Massachusetts, and was first patented on July 22, 1862. While the Peabody was not perfected in time for the American Civil War, a few were entered in the trials of 1864 with favorable reports.

Peabody carbines and rifles were made by the Providence Tool Company, Providence, Rhode Island; c. 1866–1871. The total production was 112,000 for all models. Calibers were: .45 Peabody rimfire; .45-70 Government; .50 rimfire; 50-70; 11 mm Spanish; 10.4 mm rimfire Swiss. Barrel length carbine 20", rifle 33". Finish: Receiver casehardened, barrel blued, iron mountings, walnut stock.

The majority of Peabody's production was for foreign contracts. They were adopted by the militaries of Canada (3,000 pieces), Spain, Mexico, France (33,000), Romania, and Switzerland (15,000) during the later 1860s. In the United States, Massachusetts purchased 2,941 rifles, Connecticut in circa 1871–72 purchased 2,000 Spanish model rifles and South Carolina in circa 1877 purchased 350 carbines.

The Peabody rifle was one of a half dozen different rifles that took part in the 1866 Norwegian-Swedish rifle trials, where it lost out to the Remington rolling block (which became the Remington M1867 in Norwegian and Swedish service) because of its greater complexity, with more parts than the Remington design.

The Swiss gunsmith Friedrich von Martini created an action that somewhat resembled Peabody's, but incorporated a hammerless internal striker and used a toggle moved by the striker to lock the action during firing. Mated to a barrel with rifling designed by Alexander Henry, the Martini–Henry M1871 would become the British Army's standard rifle for twenty years.

The Liberian 600 Peabody rifles were bought in 1910, during the war with the Grebo tribe, from the German government via the Woermann Co. (de). They had been captured from the French army during the Franco-Prussian War and were sold along with tonnes of gunpowder, 200,000 rounds of ammunition, and 400 Mauser M1888 carbines. The cost was $20,000. In 1919, Liberians received Peabody rifles through US arms sales.

=== Peabody Conversion Action (1867) ===
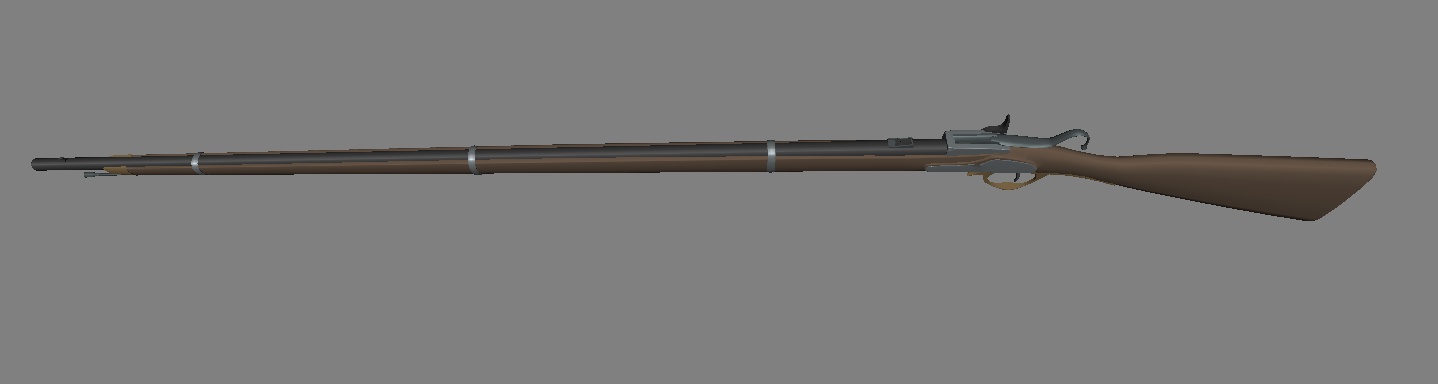
Serbian Peabody M1870 military rifle. The breechblock with tailpiece is clearly visible.

Available records show that the third patent (No. 72,076, issued on Dec. 10, 1867) obtained by Mr. Peabody was on an action system specifically designed and constructed for use in converting military muzzleloading muskets into breech-loading arms. By the end of the American Civil War the self-contained metallic cartridge was well-established; conversions of muzzle-loading rifles had already commenced, and it seemed to be a profitable venture to get into. Evidently with this in mind, Peabody developed such an action based on his original idea of the rear-pivoted breechblock, for use with Springfield and Enfield muzzle-loading muskets.

The Peabody alteration is simply a shallow version of his original action, but made without the finger lever, and with the breechblock made with a tailpiece. The steps required to convert the muzzle-loading musket to a breechloader with this action consists of removing the original barrel from the stock, cutting off a section of the breech end equaling the length of the conversion action, threading the barrel and fitting it to the action, routing out the stock as required to accept the action, refitting the barrel and action in the stock and installing a new hammer on the lock. There were a great many different “conversion” actions developed between 1860 and 1870 and the Peabody action was about as good as any of them.

Although the U.S. Government never purchased any of them, this Peabody conversion was adopted by the Principality of Serbia in 1870, and some 50,000 muzzle loading rifles and Green percussion rifles were converted in 1870-1878. Serbian Peabody Model 1870 rifle was the main Serbian military weapon used in Serbian–Ottoman Wars (1876–1878).

== Legacy ==
Henry Oliver Peabody remained childless. He died at his summer house in Hull in 1903 at the age of 77. His will directed the executor of his estate to establish a trust to fund creation of the Henry O. Peabody School for Girls, using his King Gay Farm and $350,000 in additional assets. The trustees were directed to retain and grow the assets of the trust until sufficient for construction and perpetual operation of the school. By 1938, the trust was valued at $750,000. This is equivalent to $17,154,255 in 2025. In 1940, Norwood, Massachusetts voters approved building the Henry O. Peabody School for Girls, adjacent to the north end of the Norwood High School. The school closed in 1989, with the trustees establishing the Henry O. Peabody School for Girls Scholarship Program to provide annual renewable scholarships to women who reside in Norfolk County, Massachusetts to continue part- or full-time seeking bachelor, associate or vocational education.

== See also ==
- Antique guns

== Bibliography ==
- Flayderman, Norm (2001), Flayderman's guide to antique American firearms... and their values, Iola, WI, United States: Krause Publications, ISBN 0-87349-313-3
