= Snider–Enfield =

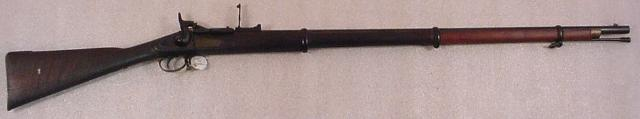
- Type: Breech-loading rifle
- Place of origin: United Kingdom

Service history
- In service: 1866–1901
- Used by: See § Users
- Wars: Third Anglo-Burmese War; Anglo-Ashanti wars; New Zealand Wars; Fenian Raids; Paraguayan War; British Expedition to Abyssinia; Haw wars; Franco-Prussian War; Boshin War; Red River Rebellion; Aceh War; 1874 Japanese Invasion of Taiwan; Satsuma rebellion; Ethiopian-Egyptian War; Second Anglo-Afghan War; Russo-Turkish War (1877–78); Anglo-Zulu War; War of the Pacific; First Boer War; North-West Rebellion; Limbang Rebellion of 1884; First Italo-Ethiopian War; Mat Salleh Rebellion; Chitral Expedition; Second Boer War; Balkan Wars; British Expedition to Tibet; World War I; Portuguese conquest of the Gaza Empire

Production history
- Designer: RSAF Enfield
- Designed: 1860
- Manufacturer: RSAF Enfield
- Produced: 1866–1880s
- No. built: ~870,000
- Variants: Long Rifle, Short Rifle, Engineer's Carbine, Cavalry Carbine, Artillery Carbine, Yeomanry Carbine, Naval Rifle, Royal Irish Constabulary Carbine

Specifications
- Mass: 8 lb 9 oz (3.88 kg) (unloaded)
- Length: 49.25 in (1,251 mm)
- Cartridge: .577 Snider
- Calibre: .577 in (14.7 mm)
- Action: Side-hinged breechblock
- Rate of fire: 10 rounds/minute
- Muzzle velocity: 1,250 ft/s (381 m/s) (original black powder load)
- Effective firing range: 600 yd (550 m)
- Maximum firing range: 2,000 yd (1,830 m)
- Feed system: Single-shot
- Sights: Sliding ramp rear sights, Fixed-post front sights

The British .577 Snider–Enfield, also simply known as the Snider, was a breech-loading rifle. The American inventor, Jacob Snider created this firearm action, and the Snider–Enfield was one of the most widely used of the Snider varieties. The British Army adopted it in 1866 as a conversion system for its ubiquitous Pattern 1853 Enfield muzzle-loading rifles, and used it until 1880 when the Martini–Henry rifle began to supersede it. The British Indian Army used the Snider–Enfield until the end of the nineteenth century.

== Design and manufacture ==
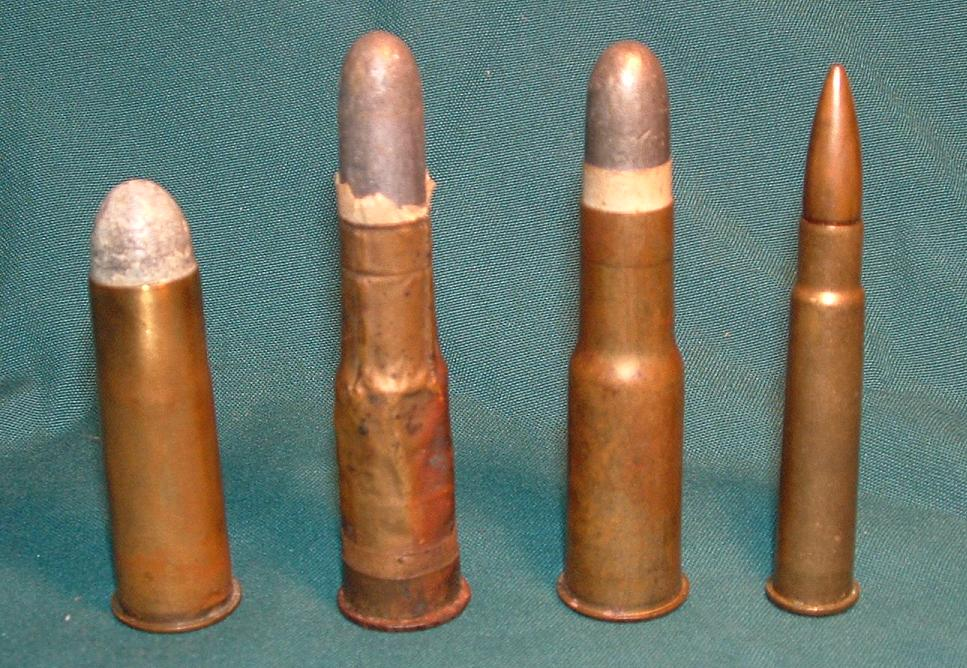
(From Left to Right): A .577 Snider cartridge, a Zulu War–era rolled brass foil .577/450 Martini–Henry Cartridge, a later drawn brass .577/450 Martini–Henry cartridge, and a .303 British Mk VII SAA Ball cartridge.

In trials, the Snider Pattern 1853 conversions proved both more accurate than the original Pattern 1853s and much faster firing; a trained soldier could fire ten aimed rounds per minute with the breech-loader, compared with only three rounds per minute with the muzzle-loading weapon. From 1866 onwards, the Enfield rifles were converted in large numbers at the Royal Small Arms Factory (RSAF) Enfield beginning with the initial pattern, the Mark I. The converted rifles received a new breechblock/receiver assembly, but retained the original iron barrel, furniture, lock, and hammer.

The estimated cost of converting Enfields was 15–20 shillings per rifle, and in 1876 up to a million rifles were converted.

The Mark III rifles were newly made. They featured steel barrels which were so marked, flat nosed hammers, and a latch-locking breech block instead of the simple integral block lifting tang.

The Snider–Enfield used a new type of metal-cased cartridge called a Boxer cartridge after its designer. The breech block housed a diagonally downward sloping firing pin struck with a front-action lock mounted hammer. To operate the weapon, the rifleman cocked the hammer, flipped the block out of the receiver to the right by grasping the left mounted breech block lever, and then pulled the block back to extract the spent case. There was no ejector, so the firer turned the rifle to the right and upside-down to allow the case to drop out.

== Service ==
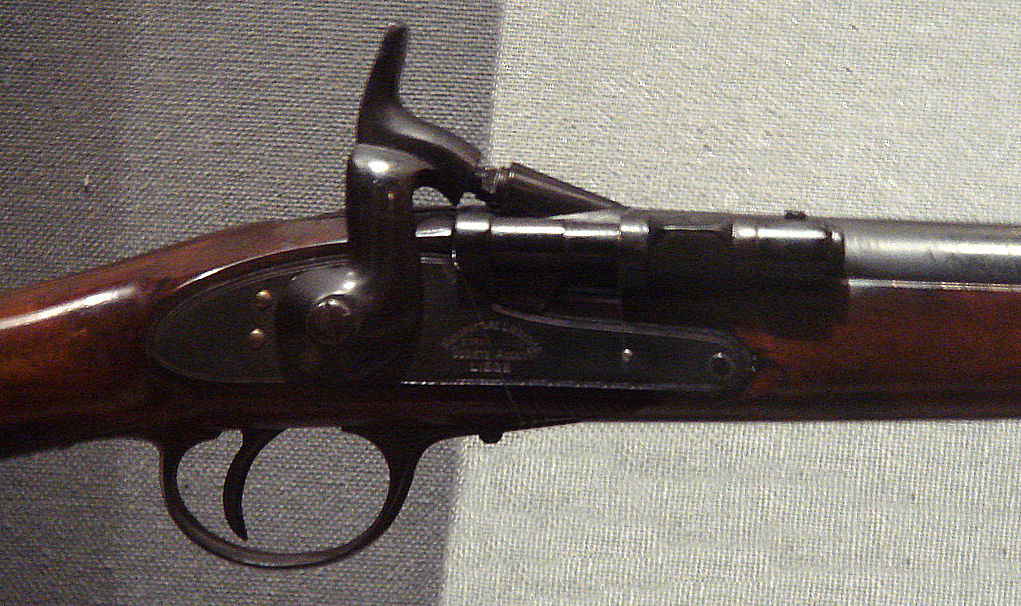
Snider breech-loading mechanism.

The Snider first saw action with the British/Indian Army at the battle of Magdala (Aroghee) in Ethiopia on 10 April 1868, against the forces of Tewodros II of Ethiopia; during the battle the 4th (King's Own) Regiment of Foot alone fired 10,200 rounds. The Snider–Enfield served throughout the British Empire, including Cape Colony, India, Australia, New Zealand, and Canada, until its gradual phaseout by the Martini–Henry, beginning in 1871–1880. Volunteer and militia forces continued to use it until the late 1880s. It stayed in service with the Indian Army until the mid-1890s, because between the Indian Rebellion of 1857 and 1905 the British kept the Indian Army one weapon generation behind British units. The Hunza Scouts may have been the last to use it in action (in the carbine version), in the Chitral campaign of 1895. The Indian units received the Martini–Henry when the British adopted the Lee–Metford. The Ijeshas used large numbers of Snider–Enfields against Ibadan during the 16-year-long Yoruba Civil War (1877 to 1893).

Frank Richards, who served on the Northwest Frontier between 1902 and 1908, records in Old Soldier Sahib that the British army still used Sniders during that period. Sentries on night duty in camps and cantonments would carry a Snider and buckshot cartridges. Should tribesmen try to get into the camp to steal rifles, the buckshot would give the sentries a better chance of hitting the thief, and unlike a .303 round, would be less likely to wound or kill a comrade should the sentry miss.

The Snider was notably powerful. Rudyard Kipling gave a graphic depiction of its effect in his poem, "The Grave of the Hundred Head":

A Snider squibbed in the jungle—
Somebody laughed and fled,
And the men of the First Shikaris
Picked up their Subaltern dead,
With a big blue mark in his forehead
And the back blown out of his head.

Faced with a shortage of weapons after the Prussians captured a large amount of military equipment, the newly established French Third Republic imported a total of 24,732 Sniders to equip newly raised units to fight in the Franco-Prussian War.

In 1869, the Ottoman government began procuring American Civil War surplus Enfield and Springfield muskets, as well as from Belgium, Austria, England & France in order to have them converted to the Snider "Polivache" system. This differed in that the locking latch on the breechblock was pivoted up to unlock, rather than pressed in like on the MkIII. These were converted in Belgium and at the Tophane-i Amire arsenal. At the start of the Russo-Turkish War, the majority of the Ottoman military was armed with a Snider rifle. As the Ottomans upgraded, the Sniders got pushed further into rural areas, such as Yemen.

Sniders saw limited use with the Khedivate of Egypt army and were used effectively during Samuel Baker's expedition to conquer southern Sudan.

Snider rifles were commonly used by the Boers—local burghers made their own cartridges, which was a little more than a waxed paper cartridge with a lead ball. Some less well-equipped Portuguese units deployed in the Niassa Province, in northern Mozambique, were still using this rifle during World War I.

== Variants ==
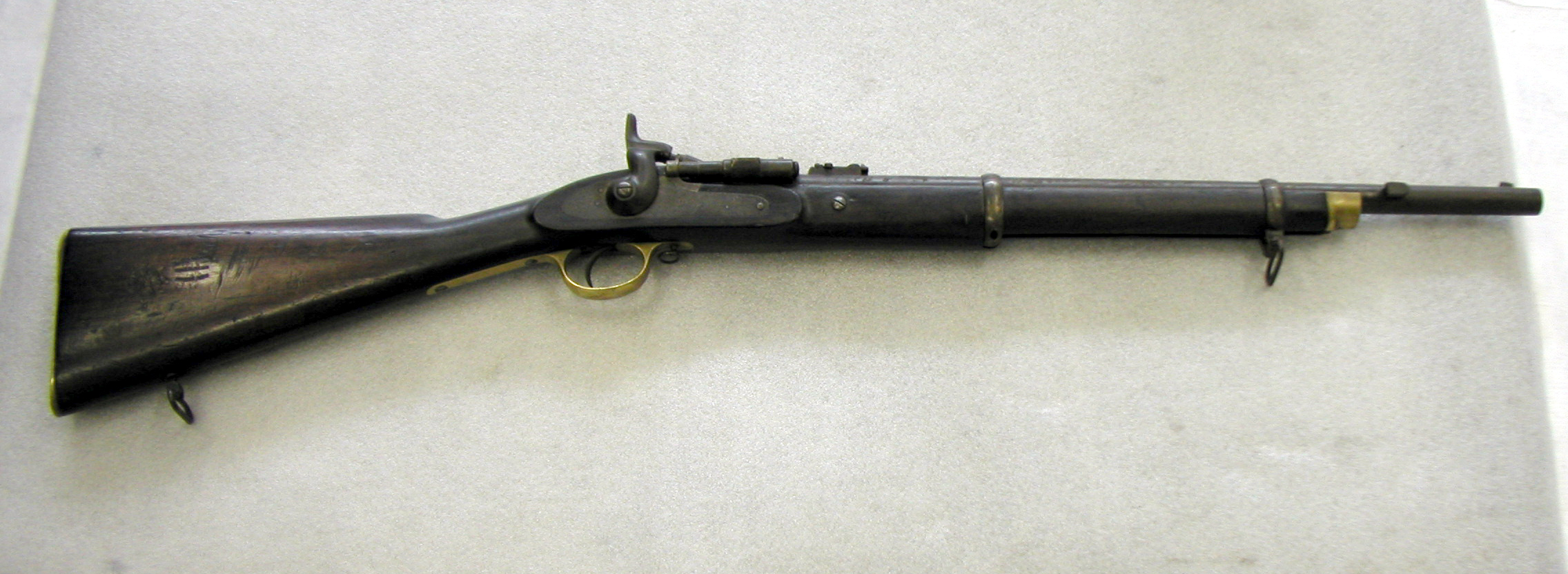
New Zealand Military issue, 1881 Snider Mk II .577 calibre artillery carbine

The Snider–Enfield was produced in several variants. The most commonly encountered variants were the Rifled Musket or Long Rifle, the Short Rifle, and the Cavalry and Artillery Carbines. The Long Rifle has a 36 1/2-inch (93 cm) barrel and three barrel bands. Its total length (without bayonet) is 54 1/4 inches (138 cm) in length. It was issued to line infantry and has three-groove rifling with one turn in 78 inches (200 cm). The Short Rifle has a 30.5-inch (77 cm) barrel and two barrel bands with iron furniture. This variant was issued to sergeants of line infantry and rifle units. It has five-groove rifling with one turn in 48 inches (120 cm). The Cavalry Carbine is half stocked and has only one barrel band. It has a 19 1/2-inch (50 cm) barrel, with the same rifling as the Short Rifle. The Artillery Carbine has a 21 1/4-inch (54 cm) barrel with a full stock and two barrel bands, and the same rifling as the Short Rifle and Cavalry Carbine.

The Snider was the subject of substantial imitation, in both approved and questionable forms, including the Nepalese Snider, which was a nearly exact copy, and the "unauthorised" adaptations of the French Tabatière and Russian Krnka (which was in fact designed and patented in 1855, before the Snider). Egypt converted part of their stocks of obsolete Minié rifles into Sniders, but further conversions were halted as the Remington Rolling Block was already being introduced into the Egyptian Army.

There were also "Trade Pattern" Snider–Enfields, being Snider–Enfields made for private purchase by various English gun-makers. These were often intended for sale to members of volunteer military units, or simply to anyone who might wish to purchase a rifle.

=== Dutch Snider ===
The Dutch Snider emerged as a component of a wider 19th-century initiative to modernize military armaments. Following the Austro-Prussian War of 1866, the Netherlands prioritized the acquisition of rifles with enhanced loading capabilities. Consequently, in 1867, the Dutch military transitioned its inventory of M1848 .69 caliber muzzle-loaders to a breech-loading configuration by integrating the Snider hinge-block system, thereby facilitating the use of metallic cartridges. While the rifle served as a front-line weapon for only a brief period before its replacement by the M1871 Beaumont, it remained in use by militia units through the end of the century. Approximately 83,000 units underwent this conversion through P. Stevens Maastricht, Birmingham Small Arms (BSA), and Geweerwinkel WDW in Delft.

=== Danish Naval Snider ===
M1853/66 Snider Naval Rifle served with the Danish Navy until it was gradually replaced by purpose-built breech loaders. M1848/65 Rifle were given to Infantry. Initially, Denmark possessed M1848 and M1854 pillar-breech rifles, some of which were purchased from Liege manufacturers like Pirlot Freres and used during the Three Years War (1848–1851) by Schleswig-Holstein rebels. Post-war, these rifles were issued to the Danish Navy as the Model 1853. Between 1866 and 1868, they were converted to breech-loading rifles using the Snider system at the Copenhagen Armory, becoming the M1853/66 Navy Rifle (Fládens Bagladeriffel m/53-66).

== Modern usage ==
Enthusiasts still use these rifles today, with the number in circulation boosted by the acquisition by Atlanta Cutlery and International Military Antiques of a vast quantity of antique weapons held in the Royal Nepalese Armory in the Lagan Silekhana Palace for over a century. Ammunition is reloaded into either modern production .577 Snider cases, or re-formed 24-gauge brass shotgun shells. Black powder or modern black-powder substitutes are used. The Halifax Citadel Regimental Association does live-fire demonstrations in the Halifax Citadel; they have around 60 of these rifles. In addition, the Fort Henry Guard at Fort Henry, Kingston also uses the various variants of this weapon for their re-enactments.

== Users ==
- Argentina
- Asante Empire
- Bolivia
- British Empire
- Bruneian Empire
- Khedivate of Egypt – Locally produced copies
- Ethiopian Empire
- French Third Republic – Used during the Franco-Prussian War
- Gaza Empire
- Empire of Japan
- Merina Kingdom
- Mthwakazi
- Kingdom of Nepal − Locally produced copies
- Orange Free State
- Ottoman Empire
- Peru
- Kingdom of Portugal − Model 1872, replaced by the Kropatschek rifle
- Qing Empire
- Rattanakosin Kingdom
- South African Republic

== See also ==
- Monkey Tail carbine
- British military rifles
- Bavarian M1858/67
- Springfield Model 1873

== Sources ==
- Dunn, John Petrie (2013) [2005]. Khedive Ismail's army. London and New York: Routledge and Taylor & Francis Group. ISBN 978-0-7146-5704-2.
- Esposito, Gabriele (2016). Armies of the War of the Pacific 1879–83 (ePDF ed.). Oxford, UK: Osprey Publishing. ISBN 978-1-4728-1407-4.
- Knight, Ian (2004). Boer Commando 1876–1902 (Warrior). Oxford, UK: Osprey Publishing. ISBN 1-84176-648-8.
- Shann, Stephen; Delperier, Louis (2012) [1991]. French Army 1870–71 Franco-Prussian War (2): Republican Troops (PDF eBook ed.). Oxford, UK: Osprey Publishing. ISBN 978-1-78200-258-1.
- Telo, António José (2004). Moçambique - 1895: A Campanha de Todos os Heróis (in Portuguese). Tribuna da História.
