= Lorenz rifle =

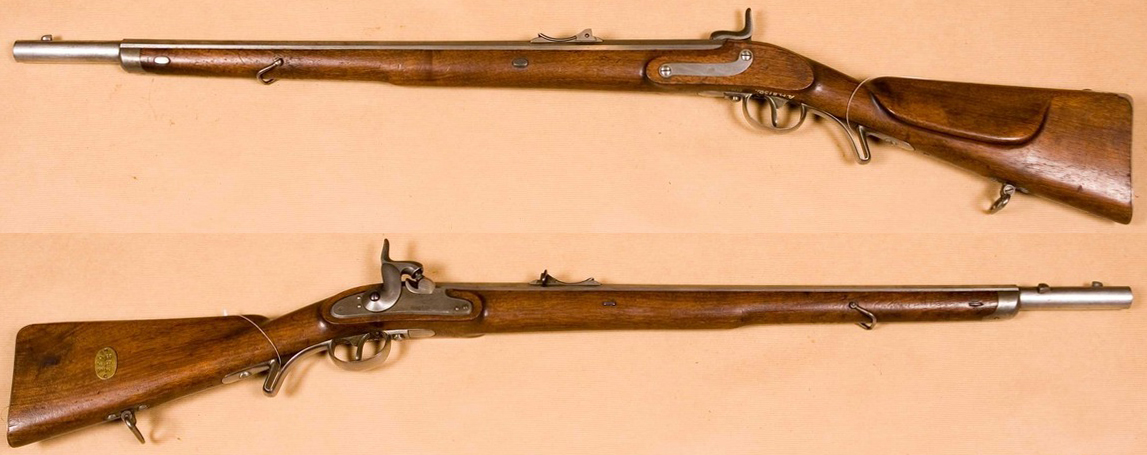
- Austrian Lorenz Model 1854 Dornstutzen
- Type: Rifled musket
- Place of origin: Austrian Empire

Service history
- In service: 1855–1867 (primary Austrian service rifle)
- Used by: See § Users
- Wars: Second Italian War of Independence; January Uprising; Second Schleswig War; Austro-Prussian War; American Civil War; French intervention in Mexico; Franco-Prussian War; Russo-Turkish War (1877–1878); War of the Pacific (limited)

Production history
- Designer: Joseph Lorenz
- Designed: 1852–1854

Specifications
- Cartridge: Paper cartridge, Wilkinson-type Kompressivkugel bullet
- Caliber: .54, .58
- Action: Percussion lock
- Feed system: Muzzle-loaded
- Sights: non-adjustable "block" (Type I) adjustable leaf (Type II)

The Lorenz rifle was an Austrian rifled musket introduced in the 1850s and used by the Austrian Army during the mid-19th century. Designed by Joseph Lorenz, it became one of the principal infantry firearms of the Austrian Empire and was produced in large numbers. The rifle was developed as part of the Austrian military's transition from smoothbore muskets to rifled percussion firearms.

The Lorenz rifle saw combat during the Second Italian War of Independence in 1859 and the Austro-Prussian War in 1866. It was also widely exported and became one of the foreign-made firearms used during the American Civil War, where examples were employed by both Union and Confederate forces. Its extensive wartime use and subsequent distribution made it one of the more significant European military rifles of the period.

== History ==
=== Austrian Empire ===
The Lorenz rifle was designed by Austrian lieutenant Joseph Lorenz and adopted by the Imperial Austrian Army in 1854, replacing the Augustin musket in 1855, though by late 1859 not all army regiments received the Lorenz due to slow deliveries, while most of the soldiers who did received them weren't properly trained to fully take advantage of the Lorenz long range accuracy.

The main suppliers of the Lorenz rifle for the Imperial Army were the Government arsenal in Vienna, local gun workshops and factories in Vienna, such as Johann and Ferdinand Früwirth, and Pirko, and gunmakers in Ferlach, Duchy of Carinthia.

The rifle first saw action in the Second Italian War of Independence, where it proved to be superior over the Minié rifles used by the French Army. During the conflict, the French made ample use of Napoleonic-style bayonet charges to reduce exposure to enemy fire, facilitated by the curved trajectory of the Lorenz, which left a gap in the Austrian zone of fire. During the Battle of Palestro, foreign observers reported that several Austrian units chose to discard their brand new, unfamiliar rifles to fight the French with their bare hands. After the conflict, the Austrians decided to eschew long range precision fire in favor of shock tactics (Stoßtaktik), a decision that would eventually result in a large number of casualties during their upcoming war against the Prussians.

The Lorenz rifle was used in Mexico by the Austrian Volunteer Corps (Kaiserlich-Königliches Freiwilligen-Corps), a unit of Austrians (including Hungarians, Poles, and Slovaks) who fought on behalf of the Second Mexican Empire under Emperor Maximilian I during the French campaign in Mexico.

Despite suffering a large number of casualties during the Second Schleswig War due to their reliance on the Stoßtaktik and witnessing the firepower of the Dreyse needle gun, the Austrians would not begin to replace the Lorenz with breechloader rifles until the end of the Austro-Prussian War, partly for economical reasons: the Vienna arsenal managed to ramp up production to 1,000 rifles per day in 1862 by adopting new machinery and introducing a breechloader design would require a costly retooling of government factories.

During the Austro-Prussian War, the Austrian infantry a mix of Model 1854 and the Model 1862 Lorenz rifles; while it was slower to reload than the Dreyse needle gun, it had a superior range over the Prussian rifle, though reliance on the Stoßtaktik—which proved effective against the Italians as they lacked quick-firing breechloaders—effectively negated this advantage; After sustaining heavy losses during the initial battles against the Prussians, the Austrian Commander Ludwig von Benedek ordered a return to fire tactics to counter Prussian firepower, but his subordinates continued to launch assault columns at the enemy lines, contributing to the Austrian defeat in the Battle of Königgrätz.

After the war, Archduke Albrecht demanded the Austrian infantry to be re-equipped immediately in August 1866 and in response, the Lorenz was hastily converted into a breechloader design, the Wänzl rifle as an emergency measure; In the following year, the Werndl–Holub rifle—which was previously rejected by the Austrian military—was formally adopted.

=== Other countries ===
After the Austrians began replacing the Lorenz Model 1854 with the improved Model 1862, thousands of surplus rifles were exported to Montenegro, where they saw use against Ottoman forces during the Russo-Turkish War (1877–1878). During the Austro-Prussian War, the Kingdom of Saxony, an Austrian ally, also used the Lorenz. In the American Civil War, the Confederate arms dealer Caleb Huse managed to purchase 100,000 rifles while the Union imported 226,924 rifles, making the Lorenz the second most used foreign rifle during the conflict, after the Pattern 1853 Enfield. In the late 19th century surplus Lorenz rifles were sold in Africa as trade guns. The Model 1862 Lorenz was used by the Polish rebel forces during the January Uprising.

In the Western theater of the American Civil War the Lorenz was the most used rifle by the Confederate Army of Tennessee, while in the Eastern theater the Lorenz was used by both the Union Army of Potomac and the Confederate Army of Northern Virginia. The rifle was also used by the 26th Pennsylvania, 5th New Jersey, and 104th Pennsylvania Volunteer Infantry Regiments; furthermore, the cadets were present at New Market and were deployed as far west as Glorieta Pass, New Mexico.

The Tyler Ordnance Works in Texas produced hundreds of Lorenz copies for the Confederate Army between 1863 and 1865, while the Confederate arsenal in Raleigh was responsible for manufacturing the corresponding ammunition using molds imported by blockade runners. Some of the rifles purchased by the Union were rebored to fire the standard .58 Springfield ammunition, while the Confederates had some of their rifles rebored to share the .577 ammunition used on the British Enfield, though the original .54 caliber was the most used by both sides. The bayonet was utilized more extensively by Confederate forces than by their Union counterparts.

The Prussians captured a large number Lorenz rifles, and converted about 35,599 rifles into needle-fire system. Some were issued to garrison or reserve units while others were kept in storage during the Franco-Prussian War. During that conflict, the Royal Saxon Army infantry units were still equipped with Lorenz rifles.

Some Austrian rifles were shipped to South America and issued to Peruvian infantry.

== Design ==
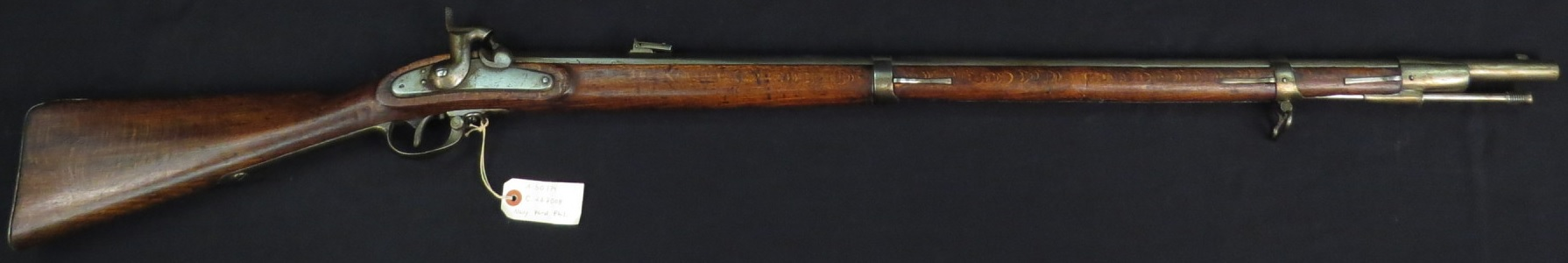
A Model 1854 on display at the Smithsonian Institution

The Lorenz rifle uses a percussion lock action, originally firing a .54 caliber bullet, several Model 1854 rifled muskets were bored up to .58 caliber before being imported by the Union, though the quality of these conversions were not uniform, and their true caliber varies from batch to batch. Overall length is 1,300 mm (52 in) with a barrel 950 mm (37 1/4 in) long.

The Austrians used a Wilkinson-type of compression bullet—similar to the Minié ball—a 29 g (450 gr) lead slug with two greased grooves in .54 caliber propelled by a paper cartridge containing a 4.0 g (62 gr) charge of black powder. The Lorenz uses a Tige breech, featuring a central spike that was originally designed to puncture the soft lead bullet, expanding it in order for the bullet to engage the barrel rifling, improving accuracy, but it also made it more susceptible to fouling and difficult to clean; According to tests conducted by the British School of Musketry, the Austrians used a high-quality powder that did not foul the breech as badly. The Tige spike was omitted from most variants of the Lorenz with the exception of the Jäger carbine, which used the spike to maintain a distance between the bullet itself and the black powder charge instead of molding the bullet into shape down the barrel.

Austrian M1854 Lorenz socket bayonet is a cruciform quadrangle (four-sided) blade bayonet designed for the rifle-musket. It's easily identified by its diagonal helical mortise slot in the socket and flattened cruciform blade (~18.75" blade, ~22" overall) as well longer than Springfield pattern bayonet. Made in Vienna from 1854–1867.

In the early 1860s, the Austrian artillery officer General Wilhelm Lenk von Wolfsberg experimented with guncotton to create an experimental smokeless powder cartridge for the Model 1854 Lorenz; some of these cartridges were carried—but not used in actual combat—during the Second Schleswig War to test for any signs of deterioration; while the results were deemed as promising, with Von Lenk's cartridges remaining undamaged after being carried by troops for months and shooting just as well as new cartridges, Von Lenk's experiments were ultimately abandoned following multiple cases of explosions in 1862 and 1865 that were traced back to spontaneous combustion caused by the deterioration of impurities left by the guncotton manufacturing process at the time.

While the Lorenz is a reliable and sturdy weapon in general, the quality of surplus guns imported during the American Civil War varied: according to author Ian Drury, in their rush to buy as many weapons from abroad as possible, American buyers neglected to thoroughly inspect their shipments and as result, some old, rusty, and virtually useless firearms were supplied to the troops, tarnishing the reputation of foreign rifles amongst the troops, with exception of British-made rifles and to some extent, the Austrian Lorenz. Some rifles were rebored to .58 caliber to fire standard Springfield rifle ammunition, but these conversions were not uniform and their true caliber varied from batch to batch. Actual calibers included .55, .57, .577, and .59; most of these—after being examined and classified—were put in storage by Union officials.

The stock is beech wood with a few made of walnut instead. The barrels have a shallow and wide rifling with four grooves, and were originally made of wrought iron, but they were later replaced with steel. Some rifles have a bright or blue-black finish. Depending on the variant, the Lorenz is fitted with a simple block sight for volley fire or a folding leaf sight graduated up to 900 paces. The rifled musket was fitted with a socket bayonet with a distinctive quadrangular blade.

== Variants ==
=== Austria ===
The Lorenz percussion lock system was used in two basic rifles (infantry and rear echelon troops) and a carbine, alongside a cavalry pistol:

- Infanteriegewehr M. 1854/I Lorenz – Infantry rifle, 1,300 mm (53 in) long with walnut stock, originally chambered for .54 caliber, it have a fixed sight graduated to 224 m (245 yd) or 300 paces, and lacks the central spike of the Tige breech.
- Infanteriegewehr M. 1854/II Lorenz – Similar to the infantry rifle, but with a folding leaf sight graduated up to 750 m (820 yd) or 900 paces, this variant was issued to third rank line infantry soldiers and skirmishers. The latter rifles also had a cheekpiece built into the buttstock.
- Extracorpsgewehr [sic] M. 1854 Lorenz – A rifle featuring a 660 mm (26 in) long barrel issued to support units, military police, and some artillery units.
- Jägerstutzen M. 1854 Lorenz – Jäger carbine, 1,100 mm (43 1/2 in) long with a 660 mm (26 in) long octogonal barrel. Carbines issued to Jägers, non-commissioned officers, skirmishers, and the best sharpshooters have a foldable flip sight graduated up to 910 m (1,000 yd) and the full Tige breech, though the central spike was used to leave a space between the bullet and the black powder charge, not to assist the soldier in ramming the bullet into shape; carbines issued to regular line infantry lacks the Tige spike and their leaf sights are graduated to up to 700 m (770 yd). In Austrian service, the Jäger carbine did not have a provision to carry the ramrod, which was carried on the soldier belt instead. In US service, the carbine was modified to allow the ramrod to be affixed below the bore.
- M. 1862 Lorenz – A slightly modified Lorenz, it has a steel barrel instead of iron. The musketoon model was utilized by the Austrian Extra Corps and Artillery.

=== Germany ===
- Defensions-Zündnadelgewehre Ö/M – A needle gun conversion made in Suhl with captured Lorenz rifles during the Austro-Prussian War using a shortened version of the Dreyse needle gun. A total of 35,599 converted rifles were kept in German inventories in July 1870.
- Defensions-Zündnadelbüsche Ö/M – A needle gun conversion of captured Jäger carbines, also made in Suhl. A total of 1,958 converted carbines were listed in German inventories in July 1870.

=== Montenegro ===
- Montenegrin Krnka – A breechloader conversion using the Krnka system. 7,200 rifles were converted in total.

=== Serbia ===
M1871 Lorenz-Peabody - By the late 1860s, Serbia sought to modernize its army but lacked funds for new breech‑loading rifles. Large quantities of surplus percussion rifles—including 27,000-30,000 Lorenz M1854 rifles—were purchased in 1867 due to their low cost. Conversion using Peabody system.

=== United States ===
A large number of Lorenz rifles purchased by the Union during the Civil War had their barrels bored to .58 caliber, while some of the early Confederate imports were rebored in Belgium to .577 caliber allowing them to use British Enfield ammunition. In both armies, the original .54 caliber was by far the most used.

== For Modern uses ==
Pedersoli released their 1854 Lorenz Infantry Rifle reproduction in 2018, priced between $1,550 and $1,700 before tax, replicating the original design for collectors, reenactors, and muzzleloader enthusiasts. Exclusive of taxes and the optional bayonet.

== Users ==
- Austrian Empire
- Confederate States of America
- German Empire
- (Italy) Redshirts
- Peru
- Principality of Montenegro
- Polish National Government
- Principality of Serbia
- Kingdom of Saxony
- United States

== See also ==
- Weapons of the Austro-Hungarian Empire
- Rifles in the American Civil War
