= Pistol dueling =

Competitive shooting sport

Pistol dueling was a competitive sport developed around 1900 which involved opponents shooting at each other using dueling pistols adapted to fire wax bullets. The sport was briefly popular among some members of the metropolitan upper classes in the US, UK and France. Although the bullets were made of soft wax they could inflict significant damage to exposed flesh. For this reason the competitors wore heavy protective clothing and guards. The sport was demonstrated at the 1908 Olympic Games but did not survive the First World War. It may be seen as a precursor of the modern sport of paintball.

== History ==
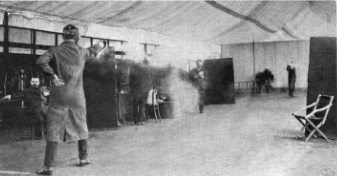
Pistol dueling as an associate event at the 1908 London Olympic Games

Fencing, or sport dueling with swords, has existed at least since the Middle Ages and featured in the first Olympic Games of 1896. In 1901, Dr. John Paul Devillers, a French target shooter, developed a wax bullet specifically designed to allow non-fatal or sport pistol dueling between opponents. Devillers developed a mask to protect the face and persuaded the French gun making firm Piot-Lepage to manufacture appropriate weapons. In 1904, he founded La Societé de l'Assaut au Pistolet, effectively the first pistol sport dueling club.

By 1905, the club had over 100 members including Cosmo Duff Gordon, Walter Winans and Frances's ex-president Casimir-Perier. Clubs were also established in the UK and US.

In 1908, pistol sport dueling was demonstrated at the London Olympics. In 1909, a match was conducted outside the Carnegie Hall in New York.

The sport continued into the second decade of the 20th century but became outmoded after the First World War. As stated by V.G. Kiernan, a historian of dueling, "the First World War may not have been the war to end all wars, but it was perhaps the duel to end all duels."

== Rules ==
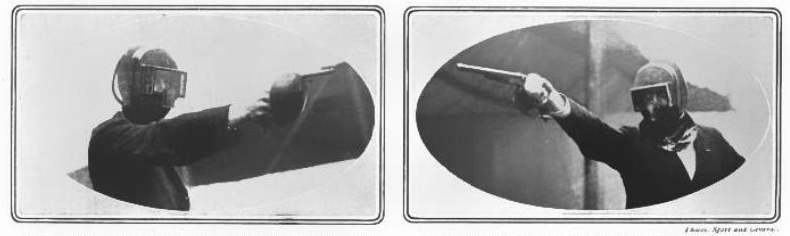
A duelist protected against wax bullets

Competitors wore a face mask incorporating a heavy plate glass visor. Leather or heavy cloth overgarments protected the body. The pistols included a steel shield similar to that found on an épée to protect the shooter’s hand. The two competitors, would stand at a distance of twenty or twenty-five yards (18 or 23 meters) apart, each armed with a pistol carrying a single charge and wax bullet. Each duelist was accompanied by a commissaire de tir who would perform the role of Second and also use a stopwatch to measure the time taken for their duelist to fire. A director asked the duelists:

"Are you ready?"

At this question the competitors were to cock their weapons, then reply:

"Yes." Both must answer.

The director then gave the words:

"Fire! One!—Two!—Three!"

Each competitor had to aim and fire between the first sound of the word "fire" and the last of the word "three".
