= Wax bullet =

Non-lethal bullet made of wax

A wax bullet is a non-lethal projectile made of wax material – often paraffin wax or some mixture of waxes and other substances that produce the desired consistency – that mimics the external ballistics but not the terminal effects of real bullets. Due to the low weight and density, wax bullets are typically used in a primed centerfire cartridge with little to no propellant powders, as often the primer ignition alone can provide all the necessary energy needed to propel the wax bullet out.

Due to the lack of propellants, wax bullet cartridges do not provide enough recoil/blowback energy to cycle self-loading firearms, so they are most commonly used in revolvers and other manually cycled firearms. Specially designed cartridges and conversion kits can be used together to convert semi-/fully automatic firearms into wax bullet guns, used in tactical training for police and military.

Wax bullets have been in use for over a century in military training, target shooting and confrontational shooting competitions where using real metallic bullets would be needlessly hazardous and impractical. In the past, wax bullets were also used by illusionists for illusions involving firearms, such as the bullet catch. This practice goes back at least as far as Jean Eugène Robert-Houdin, who used hollow wax bullets colored to resemble lead balls. When placed on a charge of gunpowder, the wax bullet would disintegrate upon firing.

== Construction ==
Wax bullets can be easily constructed by using a cartridge case to punch a cylinder out of a sheet of paraffin wax, and then priming the cartridge using normal handloading equipment. The optional addition of beeswax and/or grease will produce a softer, more flexible bullet than pure paraffin. Higher velocities may be obtained using special cartridges drilled out to accept shotgun primers, which provide higher velocities, and some fast draw competitions allow the use of a small amount of black powder or black powder substitute to provide higher velocities for certain events. Commercially produced wax bullets are also available, and may be required for competitions. These pre-formed bullets are simply pressed into the case mouth.

== Usage ==
=== Shooting sport ===
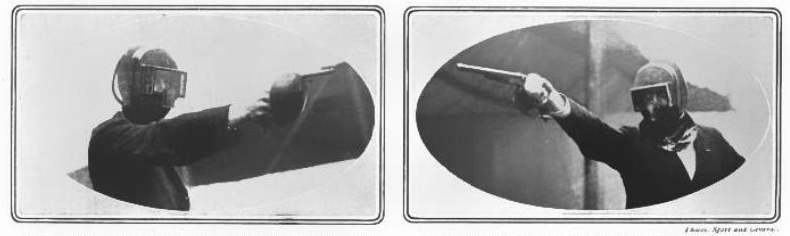
"A duelist protected against wax bullets, Lebouttellier, winner of the International Revolver Championship. -- J Rodoconachi (France) Winning the International Pistol Championship -- Almost as harmless as Duels in France: Wax bullets in mimic combats at Olympia.

Fast draw and trick shooters often use wax bullets for safety reasons, so that if they accidentally shoot themselves in the foot or leg when drawing from their holsters, they are not seriously injured. The World Fast Draw Association uses wax bullets in many of their competitions, along with special "balloon popping" blanks that fire coarsely ground gunpowder. Bullets used in WFDA and other similar competitions must be commercially manufactured, and there are a number of manufacturers who produce wax bullets for this purpose.

During the early 20th century, there was some interest in mock pistol dueling using wax bullets. The sport first gained popularity in France where in 1901 Dr Paul Devillers, who was also a keen ‘duellist’, designed a new innovative wax bullet for duelling practice. Heavy canvas clothing was worn to protect the body, a metal helmet with a thick glass plate protected the head and face and the pistols were often equipped with guards on the front of the trigger guard that extended outwards to protect the shooter's hand. For a brief time it was popular.

It was featured as an associate (non-medal) event during the 1908 Summer Olympics in London.

=== Target practice ===
There are a number of other low velocity, low mass projectiles available to shooters. Rubber or plastic bullets designed for short range target shooting with primed cases can also be purchased; these are generally reusable if a proper bullet trap is used, but are prone to ricochet. With wax bullets, a simple sheet of plywood is sufficient to stop the bullet – upon impact the wax deforms and sticks to the wood, where it can later be scraped off and reused. The cost per round of wax bullets is low as primers can be purchased for under US$ 2.00 per 100 in case lots and as the wax itself can be reused. Reloading is very quick, and requires minimal equipment: a decapper tool to knock out the used primer and a priming tool. With these, loading 50 rounds of wax bullets will take under ten minutes. Wax bullets are normally used only in revolvers and single shot pistols for short range target practice. Magazine fed firearms can use wax bullets, but they may need to be fed individually.

=== Combat training ===
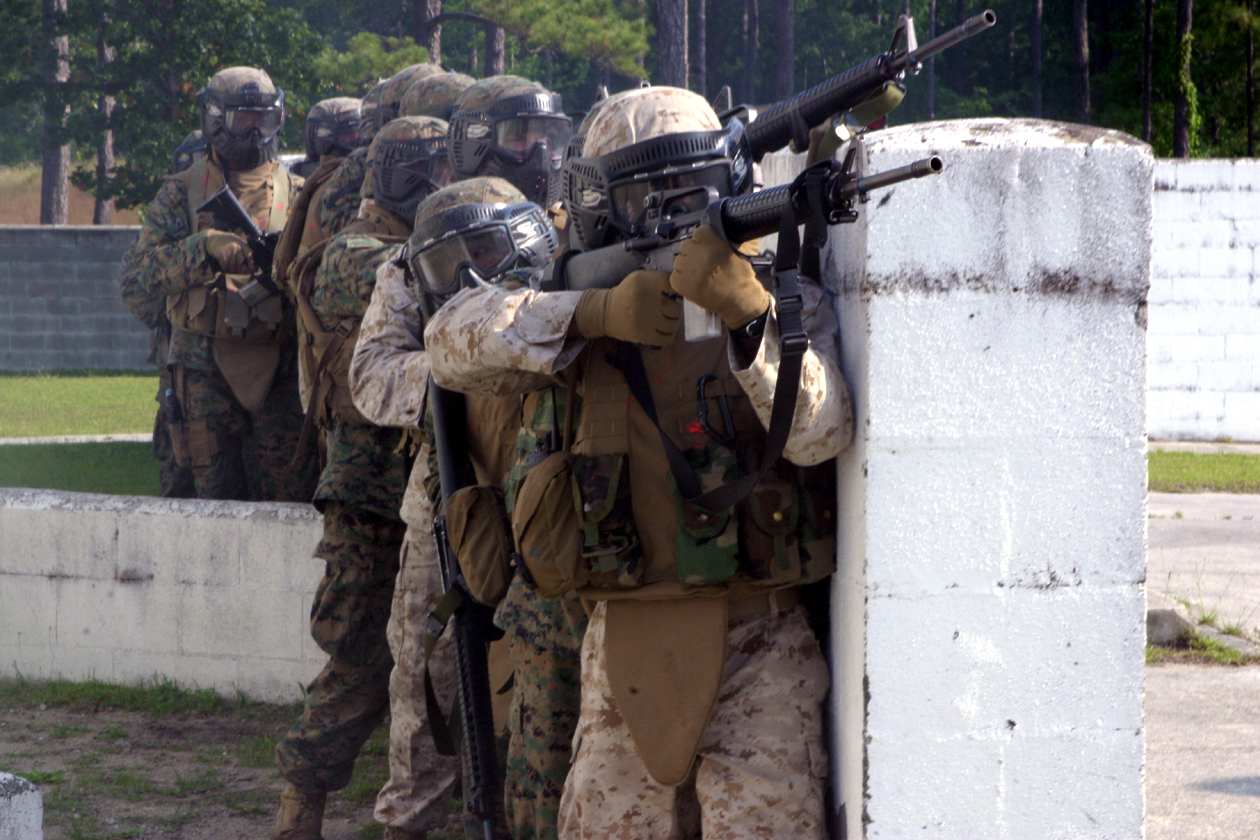
US Marines use Simunitions during urban warfare training.

The US military uses 5.56 mm non-lethal marking rounds in training. The bullet has two primers. The forward primer propels a wax-filled projectile that marks with colored wax upon contact. The wax washes out with normal laundry procedures.

Simunitions (for "simulated munitions") are special cartridges that fire colored paint-filled plastic projectiles which are used to mark targets much like paintballs. Simunitions are designed to cycle the actions in specially modified semi-automatic rifles and pistols. The paint-filled plastic projectiles are more durable and accurate than paintballs, and it is safe to be shot by them when wearing protective clothing. Simunitions are used by police and military forces for realistic training. Unlike normal wax bullets, simunitions are not an inexpensive substitute for live ammunition – costs for simunitions cartridges are as much as three times the cost of live ammunition.

=== Capital punishment ===
A member of firing squad might be issued a wax bullet to prevent members from knowing who fired the lethal shots.

== Magic (illusion) ==
Wax bullets have been used in the bullet catch trick.

== Safety issues ==
Wax bullets are not normally lethal, and will not penetrate sturdy walls, so they are safe to use indoors or in situations where live ammunition is dangerous due to risk of overpenetration, stray bullets and ricochets. This is not to say that they are entirely safe, as the muzzle velocities are around 500 feet per second (150 metres per second). This exceeds the velocities of paintballs, and serious damage could be done to sensitive areas, so suitable precautions should be taken when using them.

== See also ==
- Rubber bullet
- Plastic bullet
- Blank ammunition
