= Needle gun =

Gun with needle-shaped firing pin

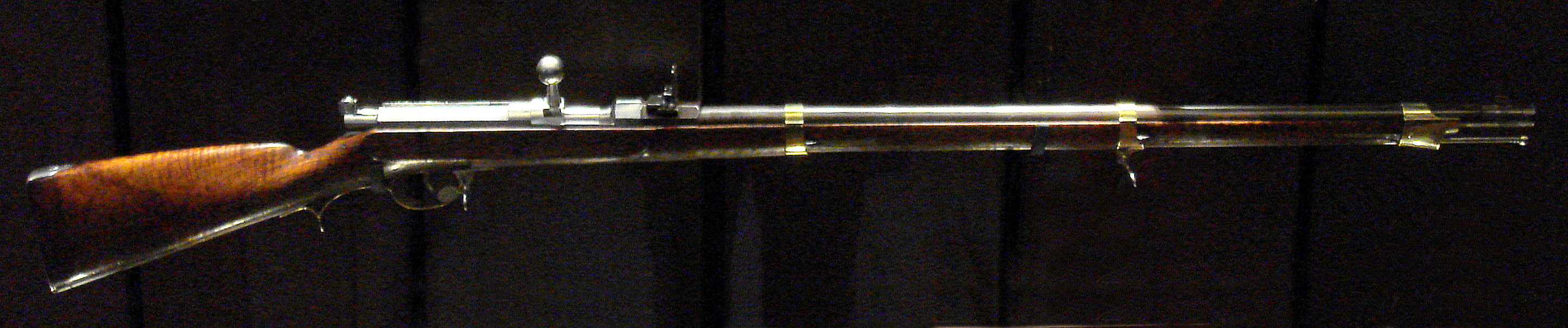
Dreyse needle gun, model 1862.

A needle gun (or needle rifle or needle-fire for varieties with rifling) is a firearm that has a needle-like firing pin, which can pass through the paper cartridge case to strike a percussion cap at the bullet base.

== Types ==
=== Pauly ===
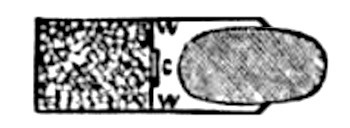
A diagram of a needle-gun cartridge, showing the paper cartridge case, the sabot, and acorn-shaped bullet.

The first experimental needle gun was designed by Jean Samuel Pauly, a Swiss gunsmith.

In 1808, in association with French gunsmith François Prélat in Paris, France, Pauly created the first fully self-contained cartridges; the cartridges incorporated a copper base with integrated mercury fulminate primer powder (the major innovation of Pauly), a round bullet and either brass or paper casing. The cartridge was loaded through the breech and fired with a needle. The needle-activated central-fire breech-loading gun became a major feature of firearms thereafter. The corresponding firearm was also developed by Pauly. Pauly made an improved version which was protected by a patent on 29 September 1812. The cartridge was further improved by the French gunsmith Casimir Lefaucheux in 1836.

In 1809, Pauly employed the German Johann Nicolaus von Dreyse, who later invented the famous Dreyse rifle.

=== Dreyse ===
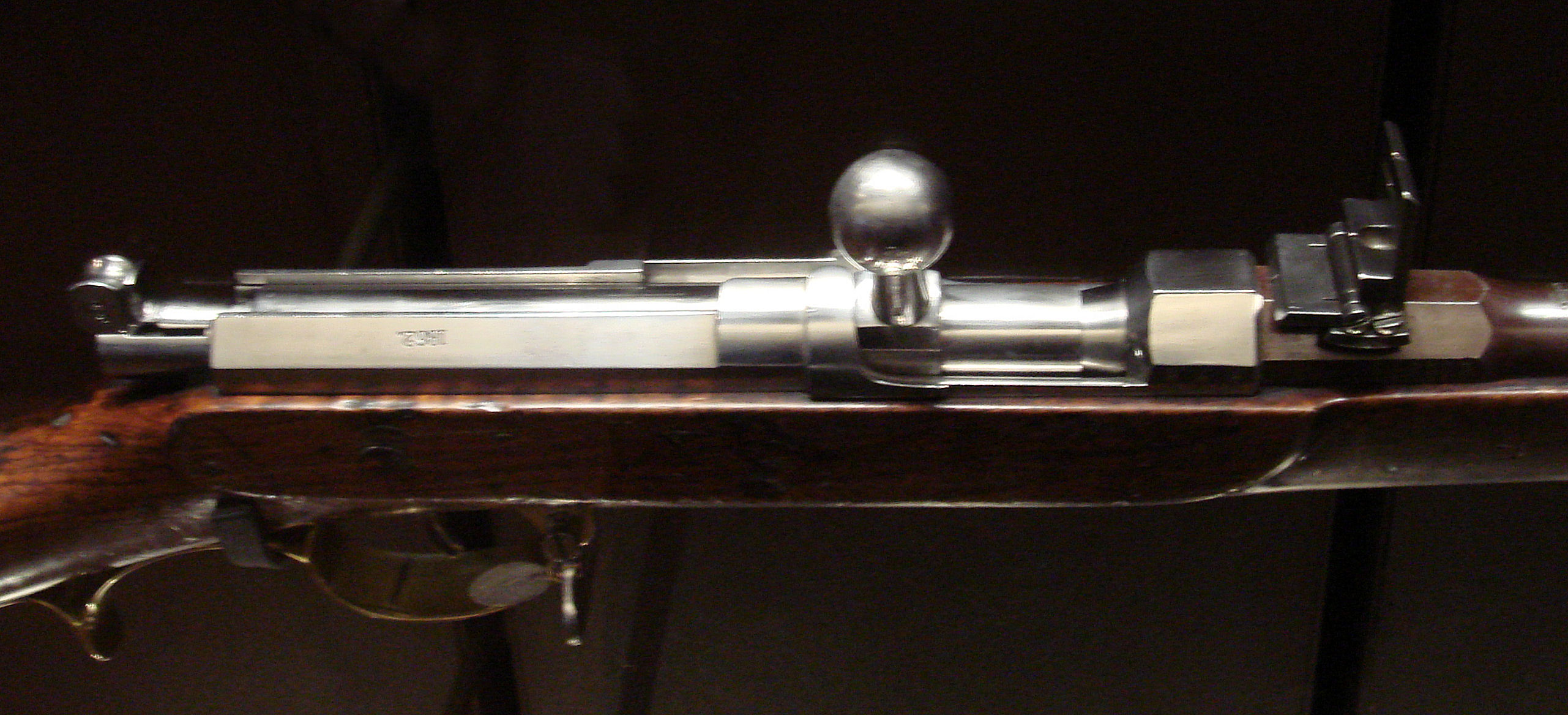
Dreyse mechanism, model 1862.

The first mass-produced needle gun was invented by the German gunsmith Johann Nicolaus von Dreyse, who, beginning in 1824, had conducted multiple experiments, and in 1836 produced the first viable breech loading gun model using a complete cartridge.

The early Dreyse needle guns were smooth-bore. Later Dreyse guns adopted by the Prussian army were rifles using self-contained combustible cartridges holding oblong lead balls held in a papier-mâché "sabot".

From 1848 onwards the new weapon was gradually introduced into Prussian service. Between 1849 and 1867, The British military inspector had trial an early bolt action variants. The Dreyse rifle became widely used during the Austro-Prussian War of 1866 when it played a decisive role at the Battle of Königgrätz. The Prussians seized a significant quantity of Lorenz rifle, subsequently converting them into needle-fire armaments via a shortened Dreyse mechanism, which were then officially designated as the Defensions-Zündnadelgewehr Ö/M. During the 1870 mobilization against France, 35,599 modified M1854/II Lorenz rifles were distributed to Landwehr units.

The Klein Patent Needlefire Rifle, developed around 1849–1850, demonstrates the influence of the Prussian Dreyse gun. Its action was patented by Charles Hartung, a Prussian immigrant residing in New York, who then transferred his patent rights to John B. Klein, which is how the rifle acquired its known name. Production was carried out by George P. Foster, an accomplished gunsmith who operated in Taunton and Bristol, Massachusetts, during the 1850s. Foster later gained recognition for his work on the Porter turret rifle and subsequently for his involvement with the Bristol Firearms Company, alongside General Ambrose E. Burnside. G.P. Foster’s Klein Patent rifles represent a critical step in the development of early U.S. needle-fire and bolt-action rifles, influencing later firearms such as Palmer carbine, Volcanic pistols, Burnside carbine, and Howard carbine. They are historically valued for their innovative cartridge firing technology and fine craftsmanship. The Model 1865 rifle, known as “Allin’s Alteration” and later referred to as the “Needle Gun”, was developed by Erskine S. Allin at the Springfield Armory. The Snider–Enfield was also colloquially called a "needle gun" (and by extension, a "needle rifle") in civilian and military marksmanship circles, because of its long firing pin housed in the side-opening trapdoor.

=== Doersch and von Baumgarten ===
This Model 1861 rifle was an improvement of the Dreyse rifle by Johannes Doersch and Cramer von Baumgarten. They shortened the needle mechanism and moved the handle to the rear of the bolt. The rifle was officially adopted in the Principality of Schaumburg-Lippe. More than one thousand rifles were produced until the principality was forced to join the German Empire in 1871.

=== Rissack and Merckelbagh ===
Belgian design is a needle-fire, single-shot sporting rifle built around a center-hammer boxlock action and a screw-threaded breech plug that locks into the rear of the barrel to create a gas seal. The hammer carries a long needle that passes through the breech plug to strike the cartridge’s internal primer. This system allowed shooters to use cheap needle-fire cartridges before mass-market centerfire ammunition became widely available in the 1870s.

The firing pin in the Merckelbagh needle-fire design was shortened, positioning the primer at the base of the cartridge rather than the bullet base. This configuration mirrored the Chassepot system more closely than the Dreyse, offering enhanced reliability by mitigating the needle breakage and fouling issues associated with the Dreyse’s long-needle mechanism. It was manufactured by the Belgian firm of Drisket & Waroux, whose mark is found on the back-action lock, along with various typical Belgian initial markings of D&W on the lock and lock screws. The firm operated in Liège from 1856–1870.

=== Soriano ===
The Soriano rifle (also called the tercerola de aguja sistema Soriano) was a short-lived Spanish bolt-action needle-fire breechloader invented and patented in Madrid in 1855 by a maker known simply as Soriano (punch-marked Soriano y Cia. — "Soriano & Co."). It was one of the very few needle guns ever developed outside the German/French sphere, with roughly 180 given to the Royal Guard and 260 to the Cavalry Regiment of Talavera; the regiment found it impractical and rejected it. Spain was not engaged in any major conflict at that time (the First Moroccan War, where Spain would next deploy troops, did not begin until 1859), so the rifle never saw combat. It was simply withdrawn.

=== Carle ===
In 1865, Johannes Friedrich Christian Carle (also known as Carl or Karl), a ship- and insurance broker of Hamburg, patented a needle gun which was an improvement on the Dreyse gun. Sohs (Zons), a Hamburg citizen, participated in the design and development of it.

The Russian Empire was modernizing its army following the defeat in the Crimean War. A part of the modernization process required the Russian infantry to be reequipped with modern breechloading rifles. The low levels of industrialization in the Russian Empire prevented Russian manufacturers from designing and mass-producing an original rifle. Instead, the Russian army tried to find a design that could be used to recycle old muzzleloading rifles and convert them into breechloading needle guns.

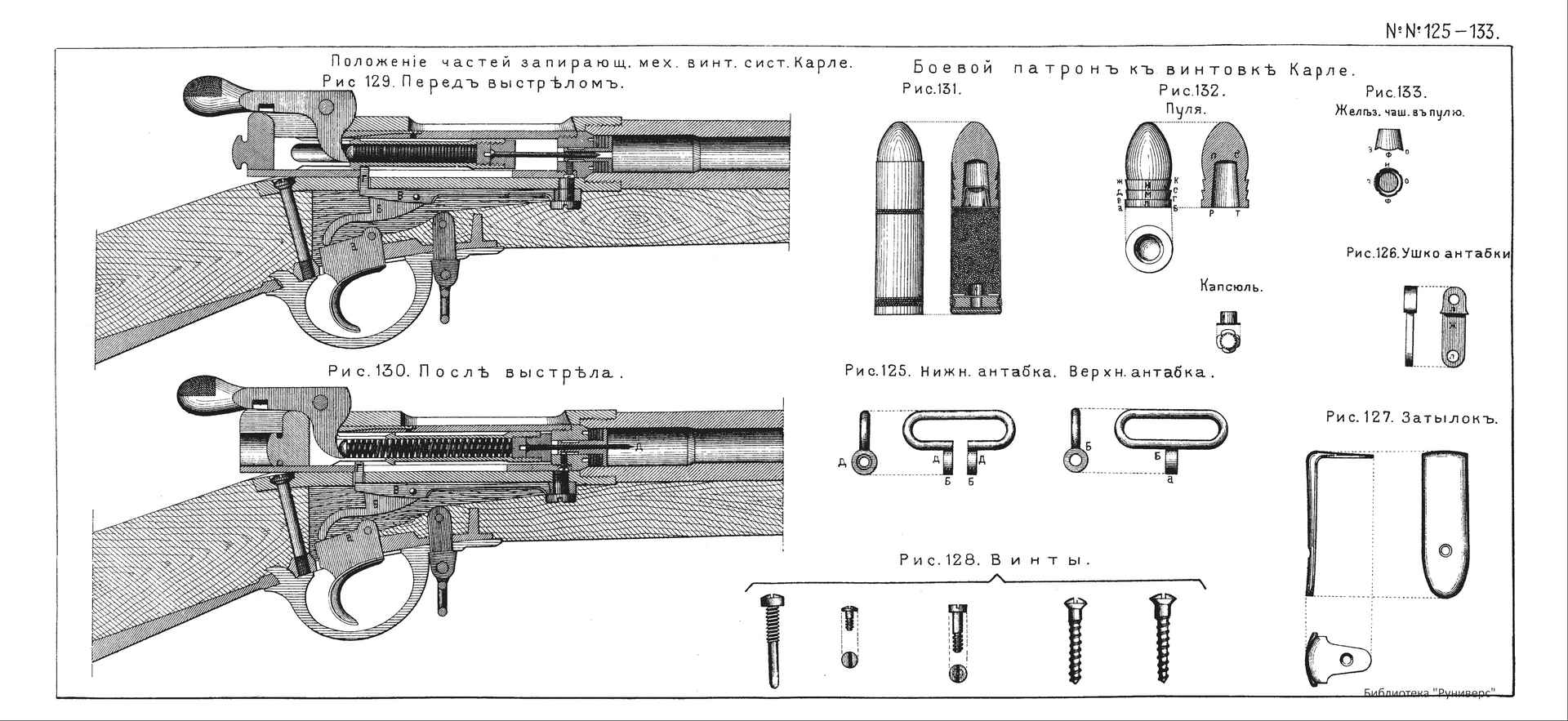
Mechanism of the Carle rifle. Top left illustration depicts the needle mechanism before firing. Lower left illustration depicts the needle mechanism after firing.

In 1866, the Russian army became interested in the design of Carle and Sohs. After a brief period of testing and improvement, the rifle was adopted into service in 1867. Around 213,000~215,500 Carle rifles were manufactured.

The Carle rifle recycled the Russian M1856 muzzleloading rifled musket. The old breech was replaced with Carle's bolt action mechanism. The rifle was chambered with a 15,24 mm paper cartridge - known as six-line in Russia. The rifle could fire between 8 and 12 rounds per minute.

Soon after the rifle's adoption into service, needle rifles with paper cartridges were becoming obsolete. A lot of European armies were already adopting rifles that used metal cartridges. The Carle rifle was quickly replaced by other rifles including the Krnka rifle and the Berdan rifle.

Despite its quick replacement, the Carle rifle was used by the Russian army in several military conflicts including the Russo-Turkish War of 1877-78 and Russian conquest of Central Asia.

=== Chassepot ===
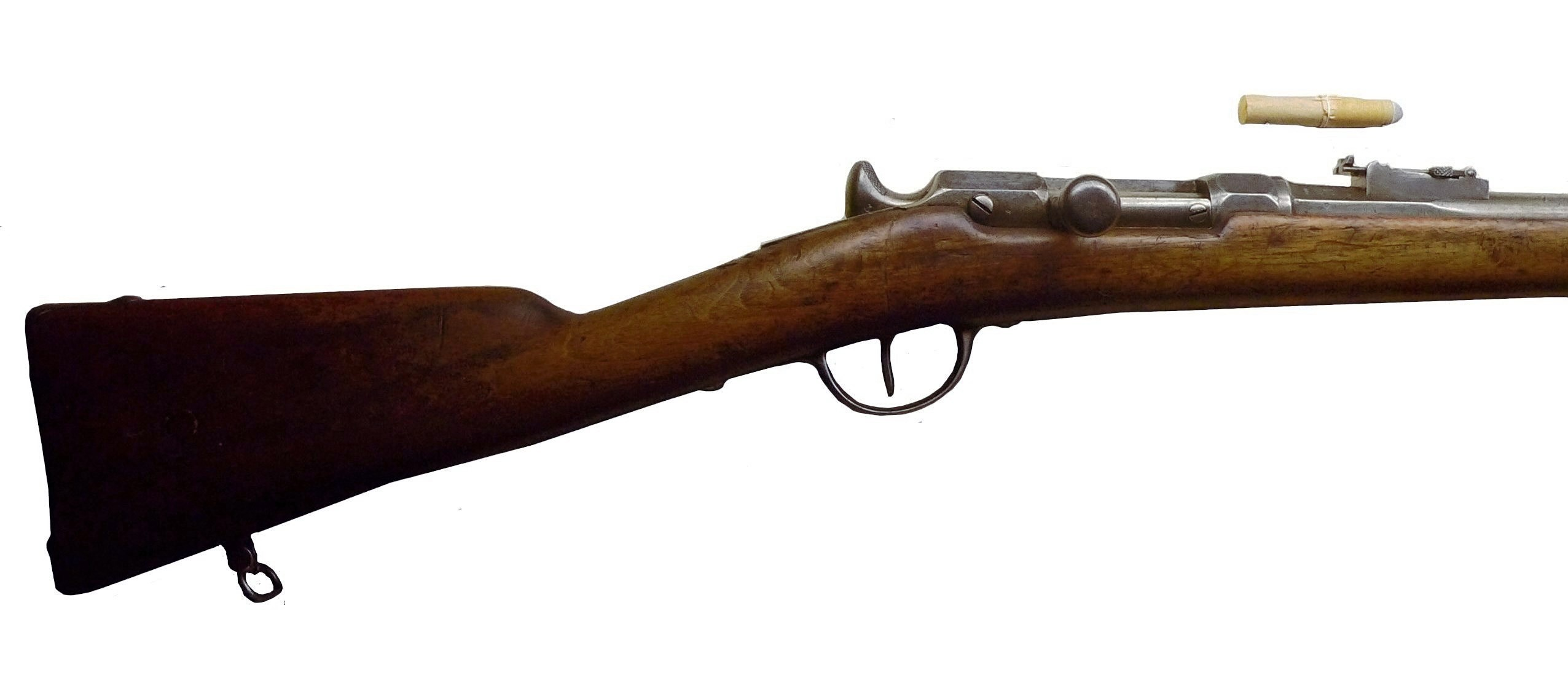
Chassepot gun, with cartridge.

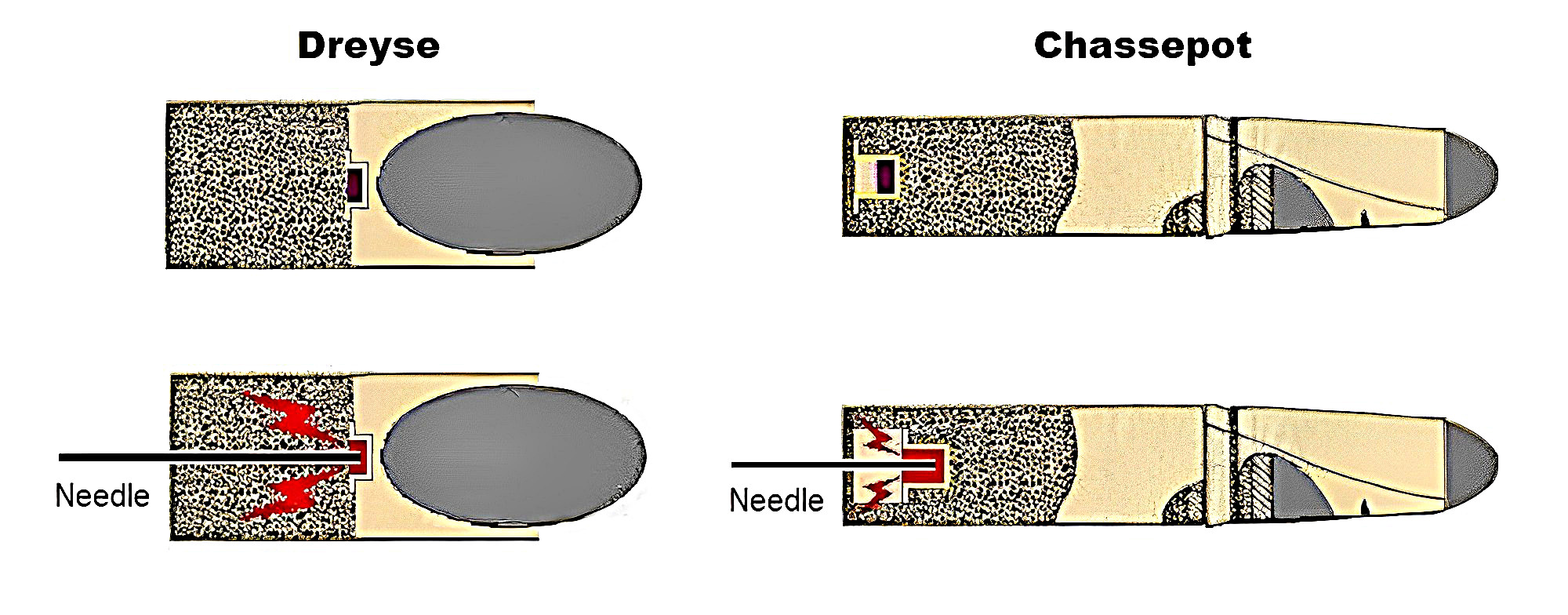
The comparison of Dreyse and Chassepot cartridges

The Chassepot was named after its inventor, Antoine Alphonse Chassepot (1833–1905), who, from 1857 onwards, had constructed various experimental forms of breechloader, and the rifle became the French service weapon in 1866. In the following year it made its first appearance on the battlefield at Mentana on 3 November 1867, where it inflicted severe losses upon Giuseppe Garibaldi's troops. It was reported at the French Parliament that "Les Chassepots ont fait merveille !", or loosely translated: "The Chassepots have done wonderfully!" The heavy cylindrical lead bullets fired at high velocity by the Chassepot rifle inflicted wounds that were even worse than those of the earlier Minié rifle.

In the Franco-Prussian War (1870–71) it proved greatly superior to the German Dreyse needle gun, outranging it by 2 to 1.

The Chassepot used a paper cartridge, that many refer to as being 'combustible', whereas in reality it was quite the opposite. It held an 11-millimetre (0.43 in) round-headed cylindro-conoidal lead bullet that was wax paper patched. An inverted standard percussion cap was at the rear of the paper cartridge and hidden inside. It was fired by the Chassepot's needle (a sharply pointed firing pin) upon pressing the trigger.

=== Carcano ===
The Carcano Fucile di Fanteria Modello 1860/67 needle gun was developed by Salvatore Carcano, an Italian technician. This rifle was operated by pulling a cocking knob on the back of the action, retracting the needle and allowing the bolt handle to be lifted. It was adopted in 1867 in Italy.

The Carcano Modello 1868 needle fire rifle had very few differences from the 1860/1867 model.

== See also ==
- Trapdoor mechanism
- Greene single needle action rifle
- Caseless ammunition
- Spigot gun
