= Alexander John Forsyth =

British clergyman and inventor (1769–1843)

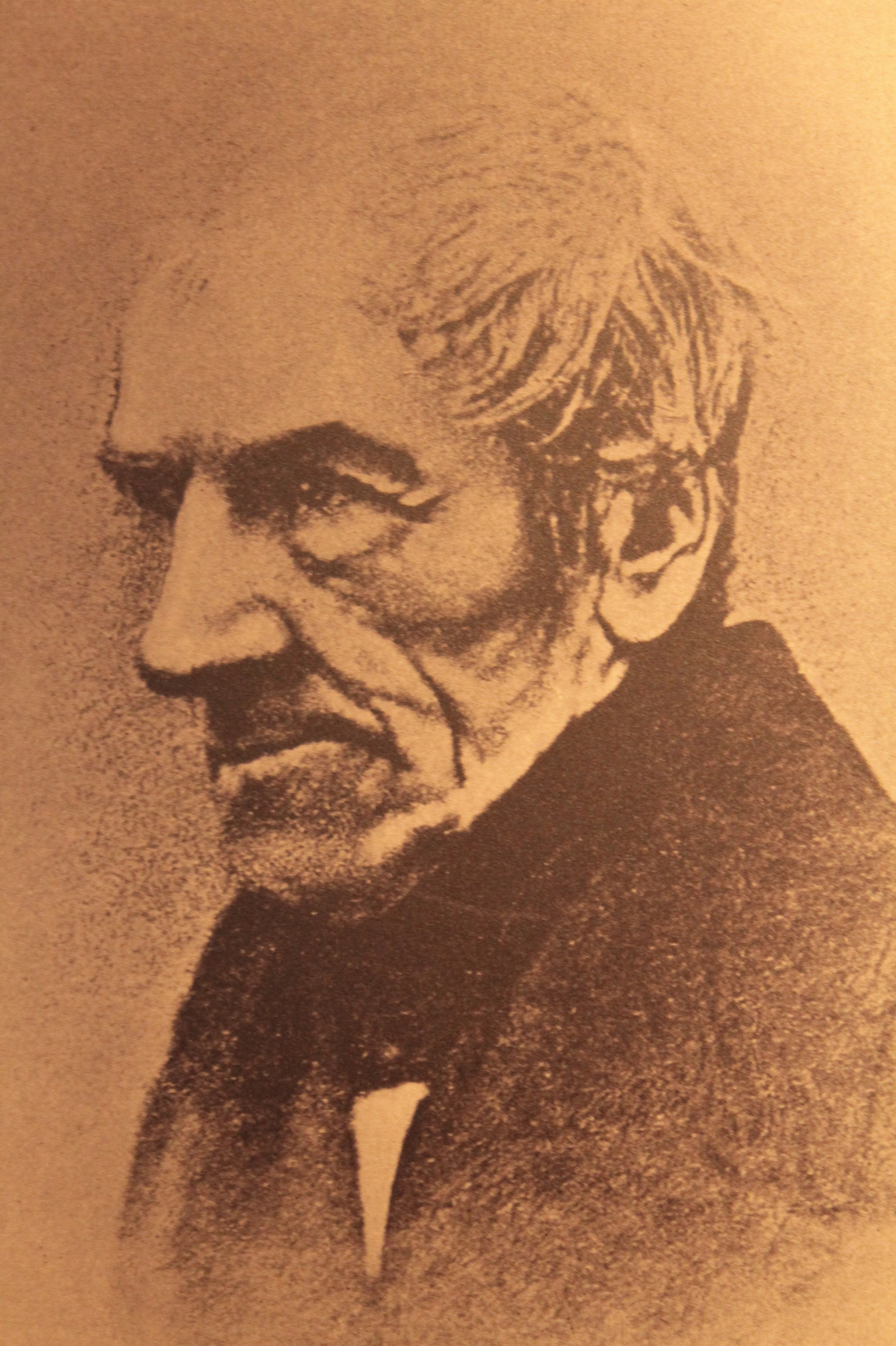
- Alexander Forsyth
- Born: Alexander John Forsyth; 28 December 1768; Belhelvie, Aberdeenshire, Scotland
- Died: 11 June 1843 (aged 74); Belhelvie
- Occupations: Inventor, clergyman
- Relatives: Mary Forsyth Reid; Alexander John Forsyth Reid

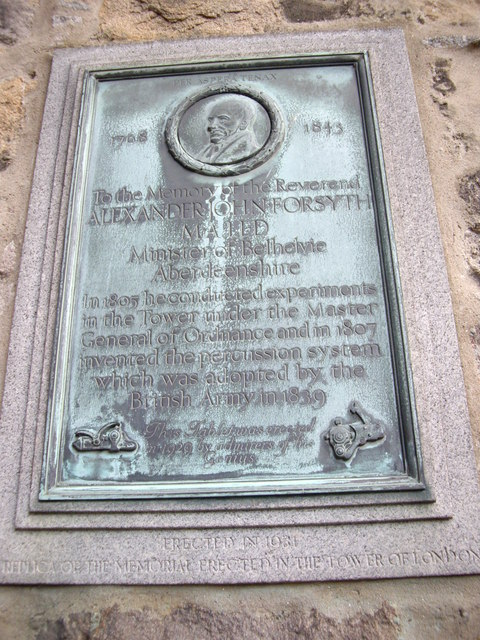
Plaque to Forsyth

Alexander John Forsyth (28 December 1768 – 11 June 1843) was a Scottish Church of Scotland minister, who first successfully used fulminating (or 'detonating') chemicals to prime gunpowder in fire-arms thereby creating what became known as percussion ignition.

== Life ==
He was born in the manse at the son of Rev James Forsyth (d. 1790), and his wife, Isabella Syme. He studied at King's College, Aberdeen graduating MA in 1786. He succeeded his father as minister of his home town in 1791.

Forsyth took out a British patent for locks utilising fulminates in 1807. Despite the patent being in force, several British gunsmiths, most notably Joseph Manton, invented other forms of detonating gunlocks in order to evade Forsyth's patent, which would not expire until 1821. Forsyth continually protected his patent between 1807 and 1821 in Britain with legal action. He fought cases against Joseph Egg, Collinson Hall, Isaac Riviere, Joseph Vicars, and Joseph Manton (twice). The most notorious of these attempted patent evasions was Manton's 'pellet lock' patented 29 Feb 1816, which importantly worked with a hollow nipple - a feature invented by Hall which became mainstream later. Manton's pellet lock patent was decided in court to be an infringement of Forsyth's patent. The pellet lock had not been a great success, but Manton's tube lock was a much better device. Manton patented it on 3 August 1818, which Forsyth also challenged successfully. However, despite conceding legal defeat, Manton continued to produce them and finally negotiated licensing terms which led to Forsyth's company deciding to license the use of locks using fulminates to a number of other gunmakers from the Autumn of 1819, 18 months before the expiry of the patent.

A number of other British gunmakers and sportsmen also attempted to evade Forsyth's patent by avoiding complicated gunlocks likes Forsyth's. They hit on the idea of a simple percussion cap a.k.a. 'copper cap', a small cup with fulminating paste inside, which, when was placed over a hollow nipple and struck with a hammer, would ignite the gunpowder in the end of the breech. These men included Joseph Egg, James Purdey, Col. Peter Hawker and the British born artist Joshua Shaw. In the face of so much competition, Shaw decided to travel to America in 1817 and, once he was legally allowed to do so, was granted an American patent for a percussion cap in 1822. Shaw made a series of claims of being the inventor in order to gain compensation from the U.S. government for their use of copper caps without permission. This has led some vintage gun enthusiasts to claim Shaw was the inventor of the copper cap. Many gun historians have concluded that the inventor will probably never be known for certain.

The first patent for a copper cap ignition system anywhere in the world was granted to Prelat in 1818 in France. Prelat was probably not the inventor as he often took out French patents for British ideas. More recently, Joseph Egg's claims are given more credence, and he is now considered the first to have put copper cap ignition into commercial production and to have 'laid the earliest claim to the invention'. In his advertising, Egg consistently claimed to have invented it and took pride in his decision not to take out a patent so it could be used by all.

These new forms of ignition proved popular among sportsmen during the Regency period, who had their old unreliable flintlocks converted.

== Background ==
While hunting wild duck, he was dissatisfied with his flintlock fowling-piece due to its long lock time (the delay between the time the trigger is pulled and the time the main charge of gunpowder begins burning); by the time the pellets actually left the barrel, the target animal could hear the noise from the trigger being pulled and have time to either fly, dive, or run before the shot reached it. He began his research into the use of fulminates of mercury or silver in 1805. He patented his scent-bottle lock in 1807; this was a small container filled with fulminate of mercury

During the Napoleonic Wars around 1806, Forsyth worked on his design at the Tower Armouries. But when a new Master General of Ordnance was appointed he was dismissed; other experiments had had destructive results, and the new master general did not wish to see Britain's main arsenal destroyed.

It is sometimes claimed that Napoleon Bonaparte offered Forsyth a reward of £20,000 if he took his invention to France, and Forsyth declined. This story is now widely thought to be a myth. The French gunsmith Jean Lepage developed a similar form of ignition in 1807 based on Forsyth's design, but this was not pursued. Similarly inspired by Forsyth's application of fulminates as a priming mechanism, Jean Samuel Pauly while working in France in 1812, invented the first self contained shotgun cartridge (including fulminate, gunpowder and shot) for breechloading guns.

== Death ==
He died suddenly at his breakfast table on Sunday 11 June 1843. He was unmarried.
