= Henrion, Dassy & Heuschen double-barrel revolvers =

HDH Revolver
- Type: Revolver
- Place of origin: Belgium; France

Production history
- Manufacturer: Henrion, Dassy & Heuschen (HDH)
- Produced: 1911–1928

Specifications
- Cartridge: 6.35 mm 6.5 Velodog; 7.65 mm
- Barrels: 2
- Action: Double-action
- Feed system: 16/20 round cylinder
- Sights: Iron

The Henrion, Dassy & Heuschen double-barrel revolver was a type of revolver with two stacked barrels and two concentric sets of chambers, each serving its own barrel. They were fired by a single hammer which had two firing pins. The chambers were staggered, such that the gun fired only one round at a time. These revolvers were based on a 1910 patent held by the Belgian firm of Henrion, Dassy & Heuschen (HDH), and were made in various calibers.

The 6.35 mm and 6.5 Velodog varieties had 20 chambers, while the 7.65 mm variant had 16 chambers. For reloading they broke open along a hinge on the top-rear of the frame, like the Spirlet revolver.

They were manufactured from 1911 to 1928 and were marketed under a variety of names that were supposed to denote power and masculinity. Names such as "Wild West", "Redoubtable", or even "Machine-gun HDH" were used for promotional purposes.

The arrangement itself was not new, having been tried in the Lefaucheux 20-round double-barreled, pinfire revolver of 1862.

The Ludovici revolver is a derivative.

== See also ==
- Pistola con caricato
- LeMat Revolver
- S333 Thunderstruck
