= LeMat Revolver =

Lemat Revolver
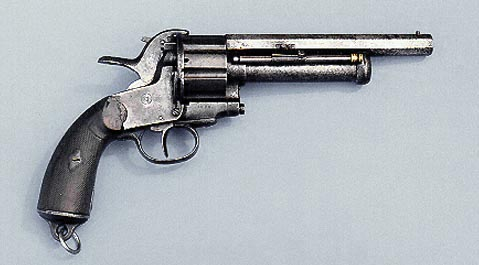
- Type: Grapeshot revolver/service pistol
- Place of origin: United States; France

Service history
- In service: 1861–1865
- Used by: Confederate States; Government of National Defense; Sultanate of Aceh
- Wars: American Civil War; Franco-Prussian War; Aceh War

Production history
- Designer: Jean Alexandre LeMat
- Designed: 1855; US Patent 1856
- Manufacturer: John Krider of Philadelphia; Charles Frederic Girard and Son of Paris; London Armoury Company
- Produced: 1856–1865
- No. built: approx. 2,900
- Variants: Revolver; Carbine

Specifications
- Mass: 4.1 lb (1.86 kg), loaded
- Length: 13.25 in (356 mm)
- Barrel length: 6.75 in (172 mm) barrel (revolver)
- Cartridge: .42 ball (.44 repro.) or .36 ball 16 to 20 ga. shot
- Caliber: .42/.44 (repro.)/.36 20 ga. shot
- Barrels: 2
- Action: Single action revolver Single barrel shotgun
- Muzzle velocity: 620 ft/s (190 m/s)
- Effective firing range: 40 yd (37 m)
- Maximum firing range: 100 yd (91 m)
- Feed system: 9-round cylinder; and single-shot smooth-bore secondary barrel
- Sights: fixed front post and rear notch

The LeMat revolver was a .42 or .36 caliber cap & ball black powder revolver invented by Jean Alexandre LeMat of France, which featured an unusual secondary 16 to 20 gauge smooth-bore barrel capable of firing buckshot. It saw service with the armed forces of the Confederate States of America during the American Civil War of 1861–1865 and the Army of the Government of National Defense during the Franco-Prussian War.

== History and design ==
This unique sidearm was also known as the "Grape Shot Revolver." It was developed in New Orleans in 1856 by Jean Alexandre Le Mat, whose manufacturing effort was backed by P. G. T. Beauregard, who became a general in the Confederate States Army. Some were made by John Krider of Philadelphia, Pennsylvania, in 1859, including the first 250 prototypes. It is estimated that 2,900 were produced in Liège, Belgium, and Paris, France. The European-made pistols were shipped through Birmingham, England, where they were proofmarked.

Approximately 900 revolvers were shipped to the Confederate States Army and 600 to the Confederate States Navy through Bermuda to avoid the Southern Naval Blockade.

The distinguishing characteristic of LeMat's revolver is that its 9-shot cylinder revolves around a separate central barrel of larger caliber than the chambers in the cylinder proper. The central barrel is smoothbore and can function as a short-barreled shotgun (hence the name "Grape Shot Revolver"), with the shooter selecting whether to fire from the cylinder or the smoothbore barrel by flipping a lever on the end of the hammer. Flipping the lever up caused the movable striker to fall upon the primer set directly under the hammer, discharging the lower barrel while leaving it in the standard position would fire the chambers in the cylinder, much like any other revolver.

The 1st Model LeMats manufactured in Paris were originally chambered for .42 caliber balls or bullets in the cylinder and had a .63 caliber (18 gauge) smoothbore barrel and had a jointed ramrod (mounted on the right-hand side of the frame), which was used to load both barrels. Later, during the American Civil War, a lighter .35-caliber pistol with a .55-caliber (28-gauge) smooth bore barrel was produced. Still, as these were non-standard ammunition sizes (.36 or .44 caliber were most common for contemporary revolvers), LeMat owners had to cast bullets (instead of being issued from general military stores). The final models of the LeMat were produced in .36 or .44 caliber in response to these criticisms, but too few of them managed to get past the Union blockade of the South during the Civil War to be of any actual use.

Design
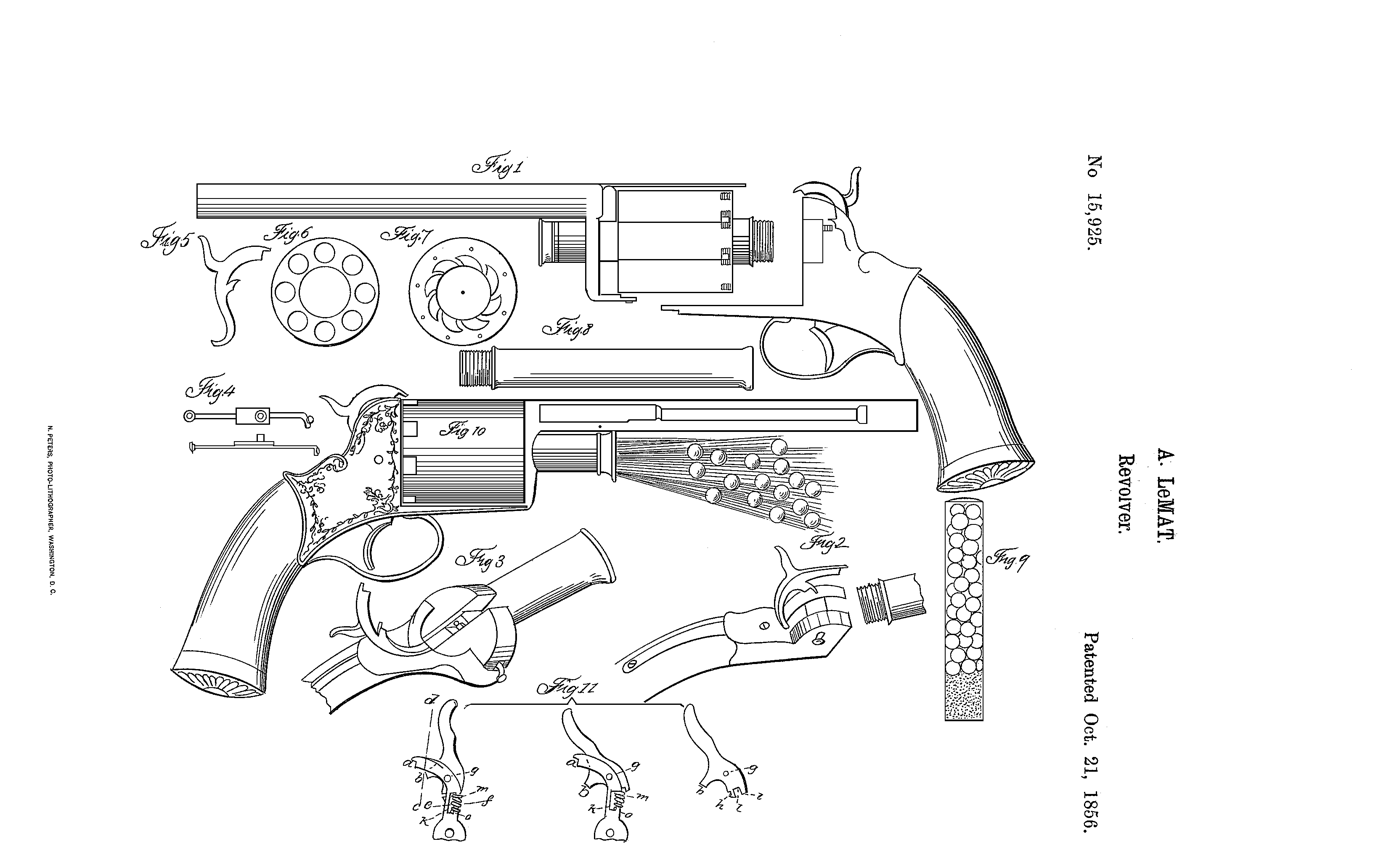
Patent LeMat 1856

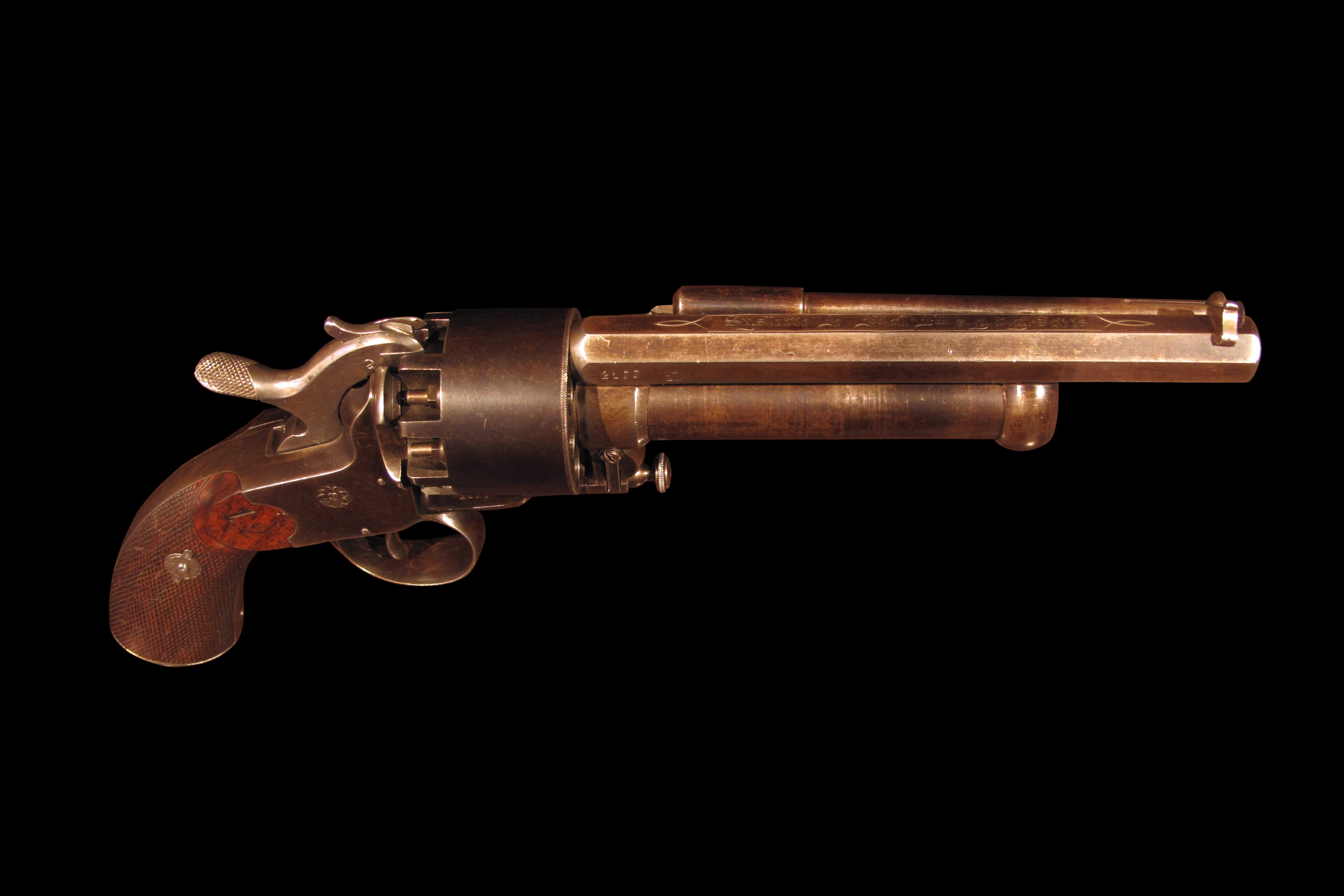
top view showing the ramming rod parallel to the barrel and the lever of the pivoting striker

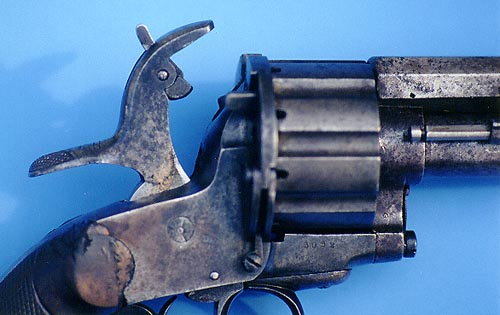
A close-up of the hammer on a LeMat Pinfire Revolver shows the pivoting striker that could be used to fire the pinfire cartridges in the revolving chambers or the secondary smoothbore barrel.

== Civil War use ==
LeMat hoped to market his adaptable revolver as a primary sidearm for dragoons and other mounted troops. He entered into a partnership with P. G. T. Beauregard (at that time a major in the U.S. Army) in April 1859 to market his handgun to the U.S. Army. Beauregard, besides being LeMat's cousin, was one of the first U.S. Army officers to resign and join the Confederacy.

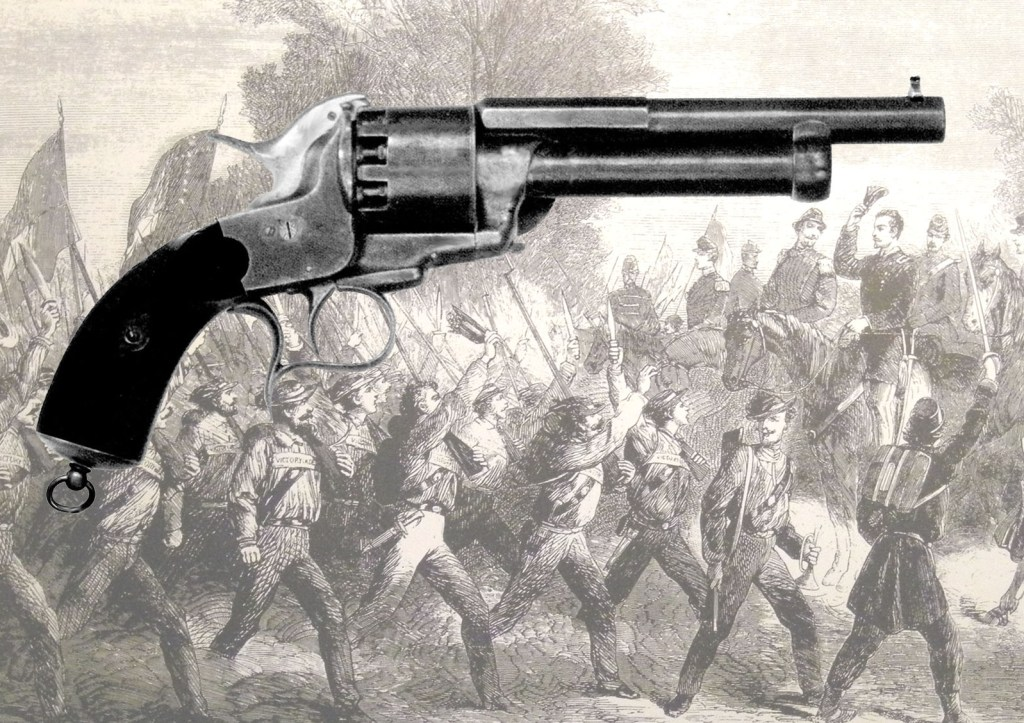
LeMat Revolver, original cap & ball model, used by Confederate States troops in the American Civil War

When war broke out, LeMat received Confederate contracts to produce 5,000 revolvers, and plans were laid to manufacture the gun abroad and then import them into the Confederacy, which lacked the necessary facilities to produce the weapon locally. Confederate gun runners were able to slip shipments of the gun through the U.S. Navy blockade, and it is estimated that about 2,500 made it into Confederate service.

In addition to General Beauregard and Colonel LeMat, LeMat's revolver was used by such famous Confederate officers as Major Generals Braxton Bragg, Stonewall Jackson, J. E. B. Stuart, Richard H. Anderson, and Captain Henry Wirz. Confederate Major General J. E. B. Stuart "was known to favor the LeMat revolver". General Beauregard's personal engraved LeMat, which he carried throughout the war, is preserved at the Museum of the Confederacy in Richmond, Virginia.

The LeMat revolver was manufactured from 1856 to 1865, with approximately 2,900 being produced. The first models were manufactured by John Krider of Philadelphia, with the second model (the first overseas model) being produced by Charles Frederic Girard and Son of Paris. Quality concerns prompted LeMat to consider production at the Birmingham Small Arms Company in Birmingham, England, but production was never mounted there. LeMat revolvers from France were shipped to the Confederate States forces via the United Kingdom, and all firearms that landed in the UK were (and still are) required to be proofed. The LeMats that found their way through the U.S. Navy blockade were stamped with British proof marks from the Birmingham Proof House, leading to the misapprehension that the pistols were manufactured in the UK. A handful are known to have been made illegitimately in the UK by an unknown manufacturer, believed to be the London Armoury Company, but only two examples survive to the present day, and it is doubtful any of the English-made LeMats ever saw service during the U.S. Civil War.

The original revolver, constructed of blued steel with grips of checkered walnut, was not considered to be a very accurate weapon, although it was deadly at close range. Civil War cavalrymen, particularly in the South, preferred to carry several pistols, as it was faster to draw another loaded weapon than to try to reload a cap and ball revolver in combat.

After the introduction of cartridge-firing firearms, the LeMat system appeared in pinfire, but this version is exceedingly rare. A centerfire version in 12 mm Perrin or 11 mm Chamelot-Delvigne, with a 24 gauge shot barrel, was made in later years in Belgium. While having better sales than its pinfire relative, the centerfire LeMat also had no real commercial success due to the invention of the double-action system. With both weapons, loading was accomplished via a loading gate at the 4 o'clock position for the cylinder and by swinging the breech of the shot barrel up and left.

== Variants ==
- Black Powder Caplock – The first variant of the LeMat.
- Pinfire Cartridge – Second variant, can be recognised by cylinder.
- Centerfire Cartridge – The centerfire variant came with a distinctive grip.
- Carbine – A rare variant with extended barrels and a rifle-type stock totaling 20" in length.
- Baby LeMat – The rarest variant of the LeMat is a reduced size version with a 4 3/4" barrel, the revolver chambered in .32 caliber, and the shotgun chambered in .41 bore. Only 100 were produced.

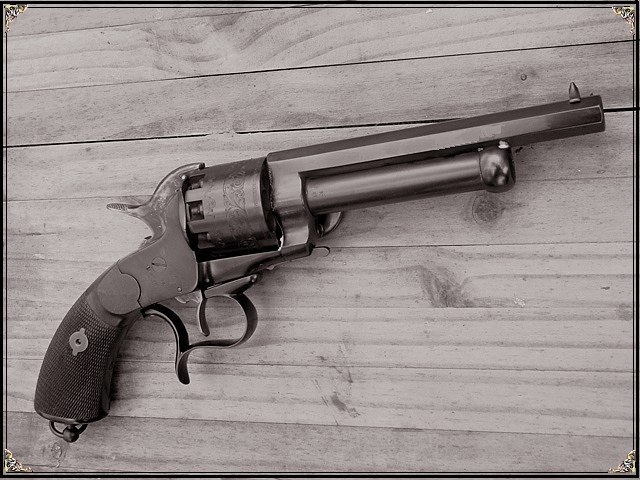
Modern reproduction of a LeMat cap and ball Revolver.

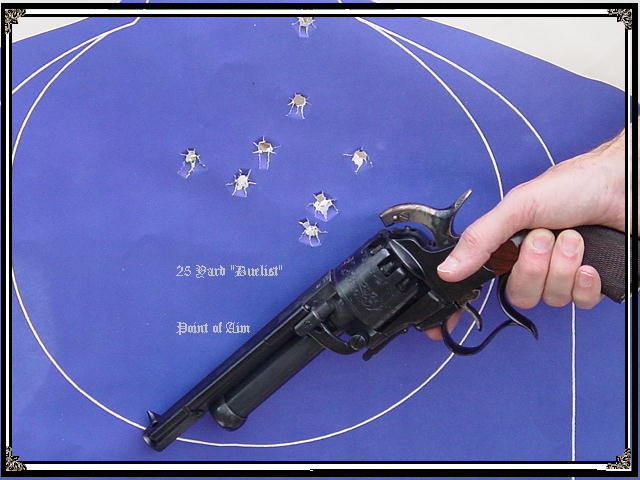

== See also ==
- Henrion, Dassy & Heuschen Revolver
- Pistola con caricato
