= Pistola con caricato =

- Type: Revolver

Specifications
- Cartridge: 6.35×15 mmSR
- Caliber: 6.35 mm
- Barrels: 3
- Action: Break action
- Feed system: 18-round cylinder

Pistola con caricato is a revolver with three barrels (drilling) chambered in 6.35×15 mmSR and is equipped with a break action mechanism. The gun has an 18-round cylinder loaded with a type of moon clip, and each barrel has its own firing pin. Using a firing mode selector, the shooter can choose to use either one of the firing pins, all three at once, or the safe position. The safety is on the hammer, and stops the hammer from hitting any of the firing pins.

Little is known of the history of the firearm. It is claimed that it was developed in the 20th century in Italy, but some have also claimed that it was made in Spain. The inscription on the firearm is in Italian and Caricato is an Italian word meaning either "stuffed" or "caricature". The full name of the firearm might have been "pistola con caricatore", but it appears the maker possibly ran out of space for the last two letters. One source claims that it is likely that only one prototype was ever made.

== See also ==
- Henrion, Dassy & Heuschen double-barrel revolvers
- LeMat revolver
