= Jean Alexandre LeMat =

American gunsmith (1821–1895)

Jean Alexandre Francois LeMat
- Born: Jean Alexandre Francois LeMat; April 15, 1821; Bordeaux, France
- Died: July 28, 1895; Provins, France
- Occupations: inventor, physician.

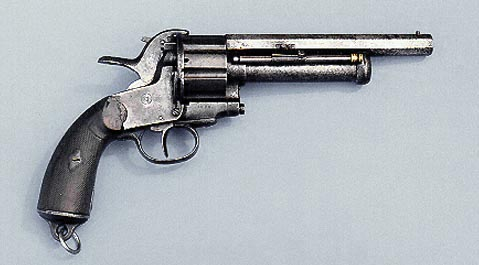
LeMat revolver

Jean Alexandre Francois LeMat (1821–1895) is best known for the percussion cap revolver that bears his name (see LeMat revolver).

LeMat was born in France in 1821 and studied for the priesthood at an early age. He decided against it and became a doctor. LeMat immigrated to the United States in 1843 and in 1849 he married Justine Sophie LePretre, the cousin of U.S. Army Major Pierre Gustave Toutant Beauregard. Beauregard later led the bombardment of Fort Sumter in Charleston Harbor in 1861. LeMat was an avid inventor as well as a practicing physician and Beauregard financed some of these ideas.

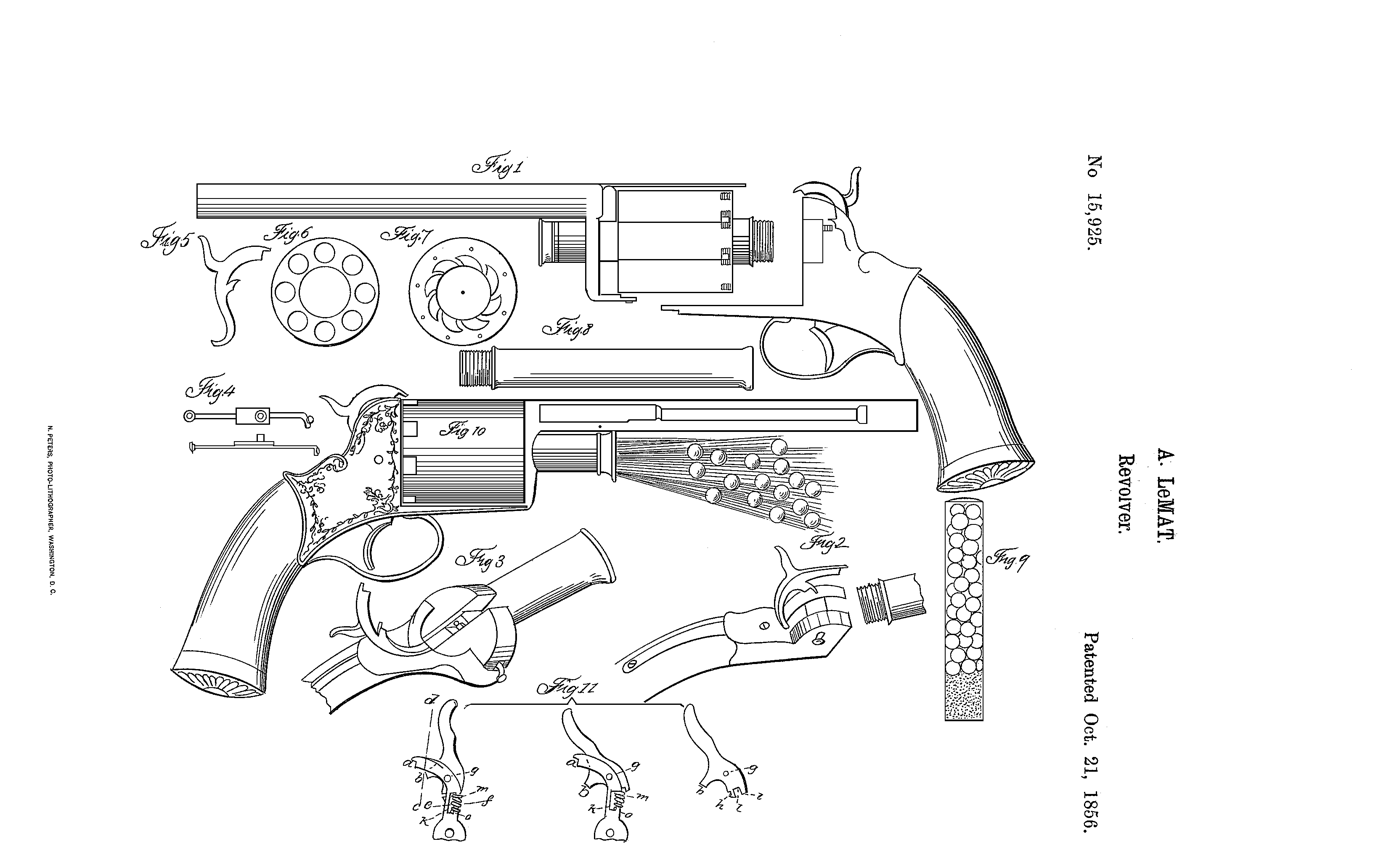
Patent drawing for the revolver.

LeMat, secured US 15925 for his "Grapeshot revolver" design on October 21, 1856. British patents for the same design were issued in 1859, and he later designed a revolver rifle of similar concept as the handgun.

He returned to France after the Civil War and led a legion of Americans during the Franco-Prussian War. While many sources list his year of death in 1883, the most credible sources note that his grave in Paris indicates he died in 1895.
