= François Prélat =

19th century French gunsmith

- Born: Paris, France
- Occupation: gunsmith
- Known for: firearms cartridge inventor
- Partner: Jean Samuel Pauly

François Prélat was a Frenchman involved in gunmaking in the early part of the nineteenth century. It is sometimes claimed that he invented the first fully contained cartridge in 1808, as well as the percussion cap in 1818. However most gun historians agree that his expertise was not as a gunmaker but as someone who monitored British patents and patented the best of them in France, which was not subject to UK law. The innovations he is sometimes credited with are more properly the work of British innovators and his partner, the gunmaking genius that was Jean Samuel Pauly. The jury is out as to whether he invented anything, preferring to 'borrow' ideas instead or just provide the financial backing for inventors. The invention of the percussion cap was claimed by several independent makers at around the same time. Despite the work of many historians over the course of many years since, there is still no definitive evidence for a single inventor. Prélat merely took out a French patent for it.

In association with the Swiss gunsmith Jean Samuel Pauly, François Prélat patented from 1808 to 1812 the first totally contained cartridge, incorporating in one package a fulminate primer, black powder and a round bullet. A percussion pin would provoke ignition. This was a marked improvement over the invention of Jean Lepage, in which the fulminate was simply poured into a pan near the breech. The new cartridge was particularly considered useful for cavalry firearms, as the motion of the horse and the difficulty of movement rendered conventional loading extremely difficult. However the failure to secure a gas-tight seal meant this important innovation would need much more development before it was adopted widely. The principles of this centre-fire design is today the most commonly used. The two men had set up a gunsmith shop together 4, rue des Trois-Frères, in Paris.

In 1818, Prélat took a patent, or Certificat d'addition, for the invention of the percussion cap (ignition copper cap) to be used in cartridges, thus replacing the magazine lock mechanism.

Prélat showed some firearms at the 1855 Paris Universal Exposition.
