= Johann Nicolaus von Dreyse =

19th Century Fire-arms Inventor and Manufacturer

Johann Nikolaus von Dreyse
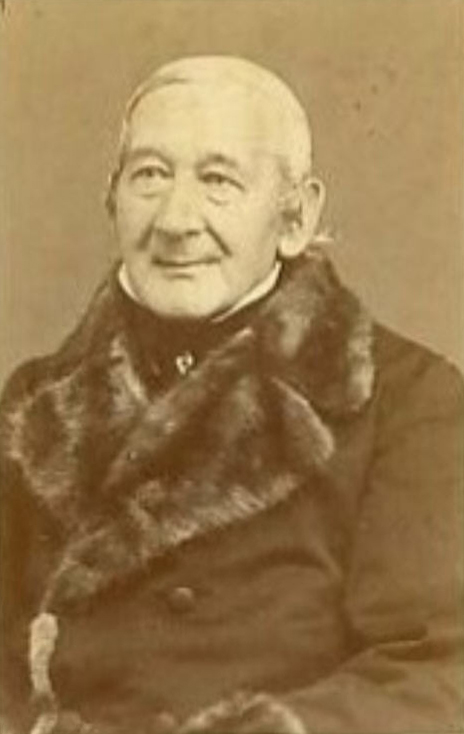
- Born: 20 November 1787; Sömmerda, Electorate of Mainz
- Died: 9 December 1867 (aged 80); Sömmerda, Prussia
- Occupations: Inventor, Entrepreneur
- Known for: Designing the Dreyse needle gun

Johann Nicolaus von Dreyse (20 November 1787 – 9 December 1867) was a German firearms inventor and manufacturer. He is most famous for submitting the Dreyse needle gun in 1836 to the Prussian army, which was adopted for service in December 1840 as the Leichte Perkussions-Gewehr M 1841 – a name deliberately chosen to mislead about the rifle's mechanism – later renamed Zündnadelgewehr M 1841 in 1855.

== Biography ==
Dreyse was born in Sömmerda (then ruled by the Archbishopric of Mainz), the son of a locksmith. Dreyse worked from 1809 to 1814 in the Parisian gun factory of Jean-Samuel Pauly, a Swiss who designed several experimental breech-loading military rifles. After returning to Sömmerda in 1814, he founded a company to manufacture percussion caps. It was there that he designed the needle rifle.

While the gun is thought of by some to be the first bolt-action rifle, in reality it bears little resemblance to modern bolt-action rifles, except for the bolt principle itself which was applied to close the breech. Ammunition for the Dreyse rifle was made up of paper cartridges holding the bullet into a sabot. The gun's needle penetrated the paper cartridge before igniting the black powder charge. The Dreyse's simple construction made it relatively easy to keep clean and in operation. For instance, worn needles could be quickly replaced without dismantling the bolt mechanism. The Dreyse rifle was a significant ordnance improvement for its time, since it permitted a much faster rate of fire than the muzzle-loading rifled muskets which were the standard of world's armies until the mid-1860s. It also enabled riflemen to reload without standing and exposing themselves to fire.

The Dreyse rifle was used by the Prussians during the Second Schleswig War, Austro-Prussian War, and the Franco-Prussian War. By that time, the gun was fast becoming obsolete, and was outclassed by the French bolt-action Mle 1866 Chassepot rifle. Other bolt-action rifle designs had emerged in other countries. For example, in 1869 Switzerland adopted the bolt-action Vetterli rifle, which was a tube-magazine rimfire metallic cartridge repeater. The French transformed the 11mm Chassepot into a metallic-cartridge bolt-action rifle, the Mle 1874 Gras. Germany had also switched earlier to an 11mm metallic cartridge with the entirely new Mauser Model 1871 bolt-action rifle. Great Britain and the U.S. evolved from muzzle-loaders to metallic-cartridge breech-loaders, but with systems other than bolt action, during that same period.

There remains some ambiguity about the activities of von Dreyse after he created the needle-gun, as he seems to have dropped the Johann part of his name and was known as Nikolaus von Dreyse.

== Gallery ==
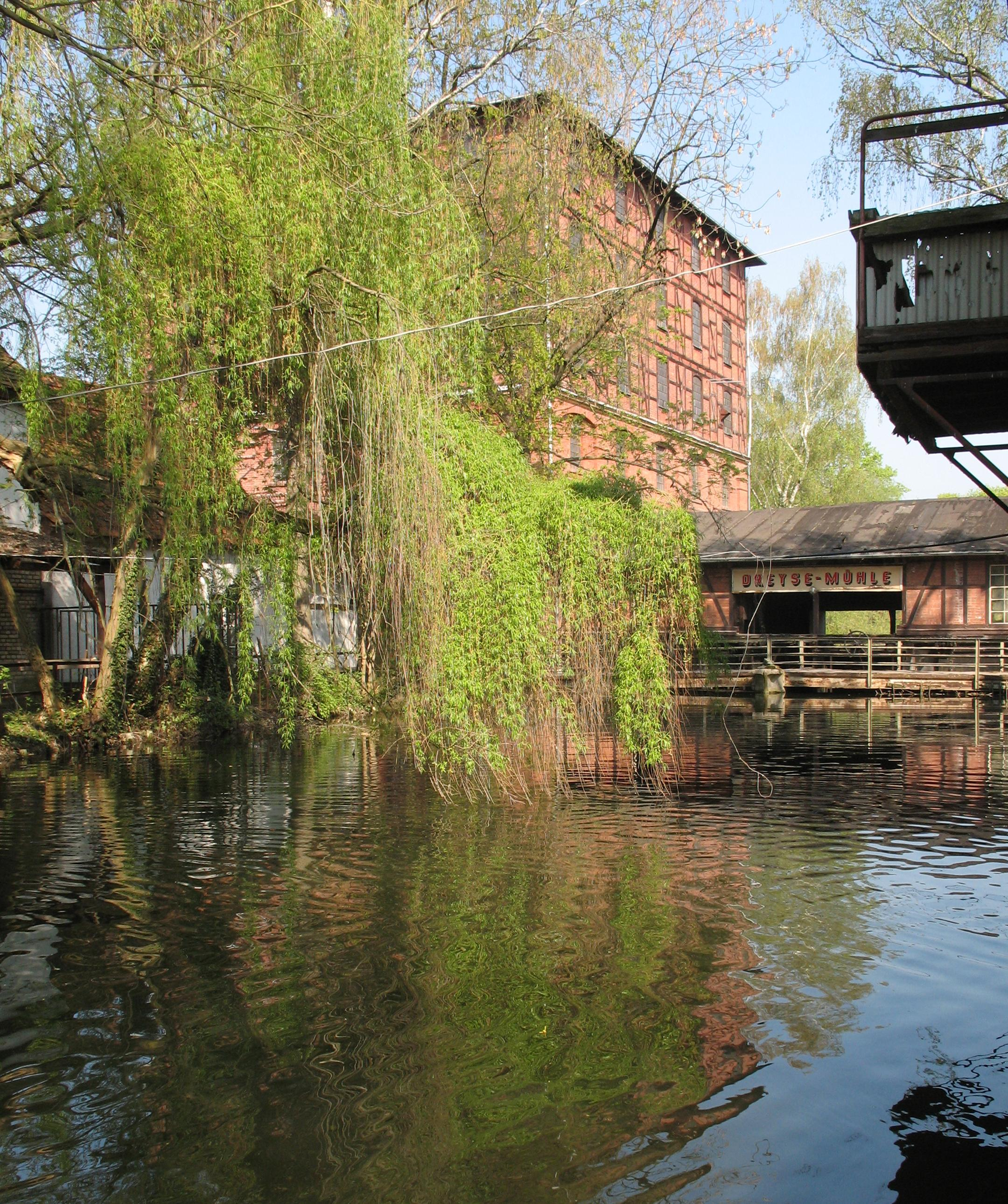
Dreyse mill in Sömmerda

Dreyse Zündnadelgewehr/Prussian Model 1841

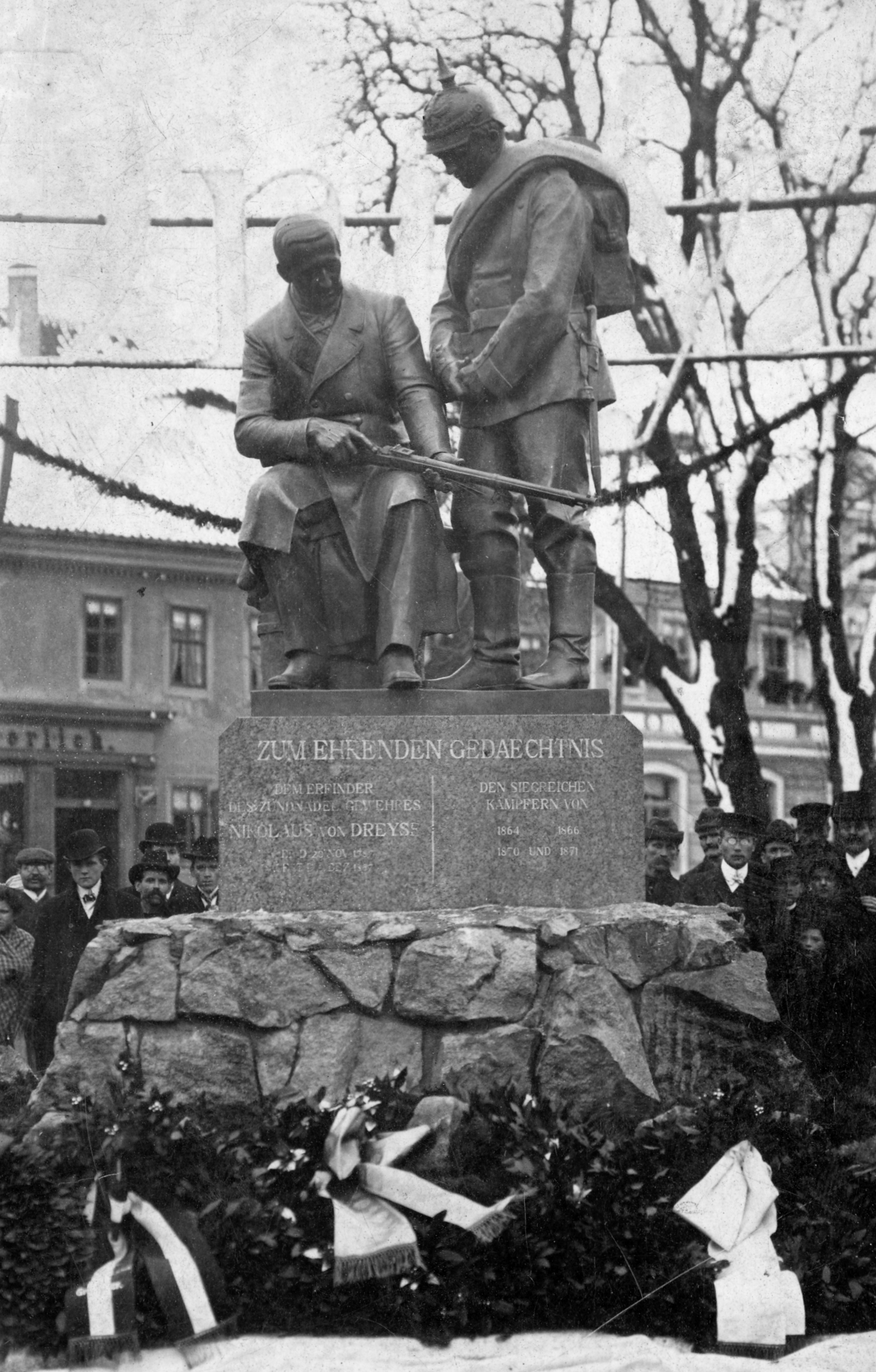
Unveiling of the Dreyse Memorial in Sömmerda, 1909
