= Jean Lepage =

Jean Lepage carbine (1800)
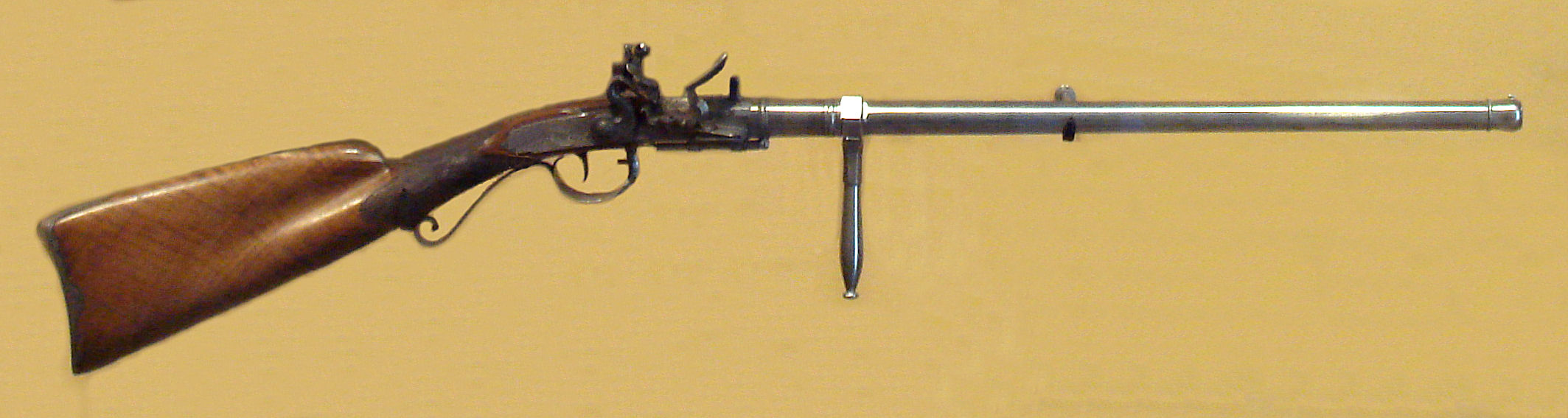
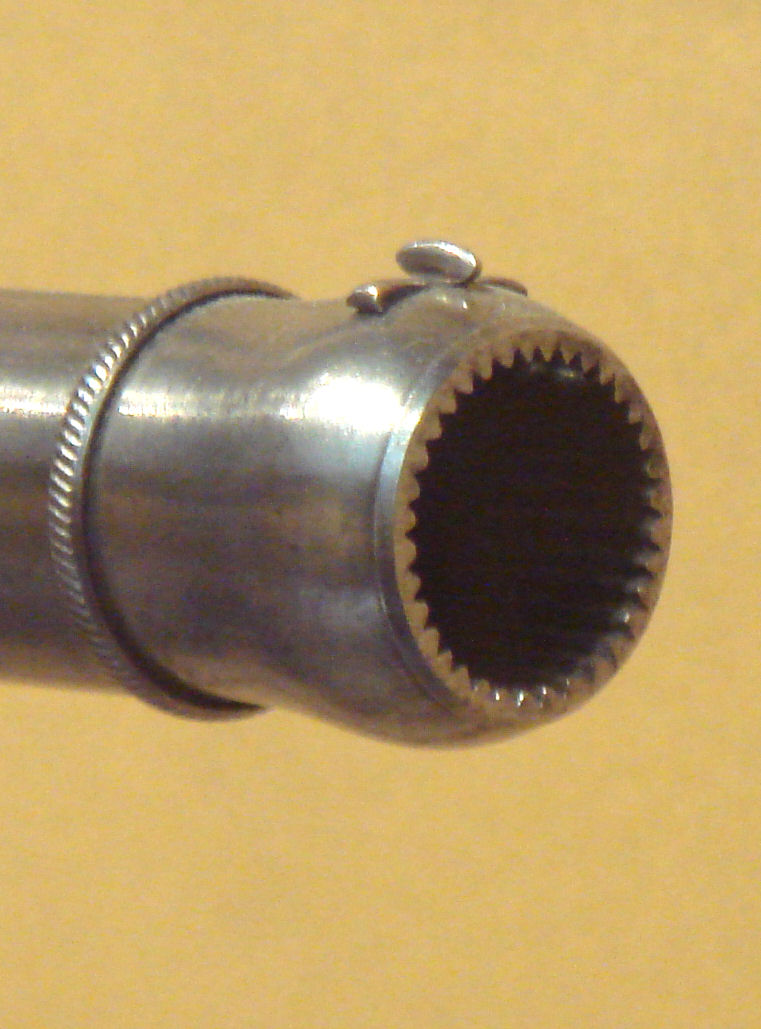
Left image: Lepage carbine, circa 1800.
Right image: Rifling of Lepage carbine.

Jean Le Page (1746–1834) was a well-known French gunsmith. He worked for Louis XVI, Napoléon and then Louis XVIII. He was the inventor of fulminate percussion systems for firearms, which superseded the flint-lock mechanism and opened the way to modern firearms. This followed the discovery of fulminates by Edward Charles Howard in 1800.

Between 1807 and 1810, Le Page invented a new way to fire portative firearms, by using the mercury fulminate priming medium to be fired by the blow of a percussion hammer. The new method permitted the abandonment of flint-lock firing mechanisms and opened the way to modern firing methods. The new mechanism used a magazine filled with fulminate primer, which would deliver a small amount of priming powder near the gun breech every time the magazine was cocked. Since the fulminate powder was highly sensitive to humidity, methods of coating the fulminate in varnish were developed, as well as methods of encasing the fulminate culminating with the invention of the percussion cap by François Prélat in 1818 and Deloubert in 1820.
