= Jean Samuel Pauly =

Swiss inventor and gunsmith

- Born: 1766; Vechigen
- Died: c. 1821; London (possibly Islington)
- Other names: Samuel Johannes Pauli, Samuel John Pauly, John Pauly
- Occupations: Inventor, gunsmith

Jean Samuel Pauly (1766 – c. 1821), born Samuel Johannes Pauli, was a Swiss inventor and gunsmith of the early 19th century. Parish records show that he was baptised in Vechigen near Bern, Switzerland on 13 April 1766, the son of Johann Pauli and Veronika Christine (née Pulfer).

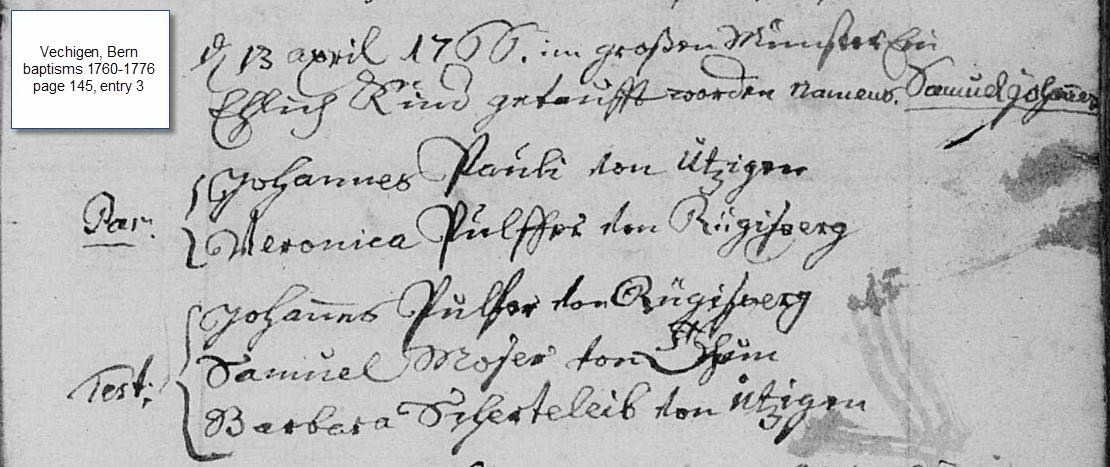
Baptism of Samuel Johannes Pauli, 13 Apr 1766, in Vechigen, Berne, Switzerland.

== Career ==
=== Switzerland ===
Pauly started working as a carriage builder and mechanic in his father's workshop; he was constantly looking for technical improvements (such as a self-lubricating axle) and also ways to increase the comfort of passengers. He later moved away to settle in nearby Bern in order to sell his inventions to the rich patricians there; a written testimony advertising his own carriages and promoting his technical successes may be seen in the city's trade handbook of 1796.

However, all this ended when, in March 1798, more than 30,000 French soldiers marched on the Zähringerstadt in the medieval area of the city to secure free access to the Alpine passes for Napoleon Bonaparte, and also to rob the legendary Bernese treasury to finance the campaign in Egypt. Pauly was an artillery sergeant in the Swiss Army, and, seeing the superiority of the light and easily mobile guns of the French over the heavy Bernese ones (which required a team of oxen), he went on to design artillery for the new Helvetian army that required just a horse or a few strong men. Whilst fighting in Massena's campaign against the Russians in 1799, he wrote a manual about the usage of firearms.

Many bridges in the new Helvetic Republic had been destroyed during the invasion, and in 1801 Pauly submitted plans to the central government for an elegant arched bridge with great carrying capacity. Those plans were checked and approved, and he even received two hundred francs from the Helvetian State Treasury, but, as the new state was constantly on the brink of bankruptcy, further money never materialised, and, with little demand for new carriages either, Pauly had to look around for a new way of earning his living.

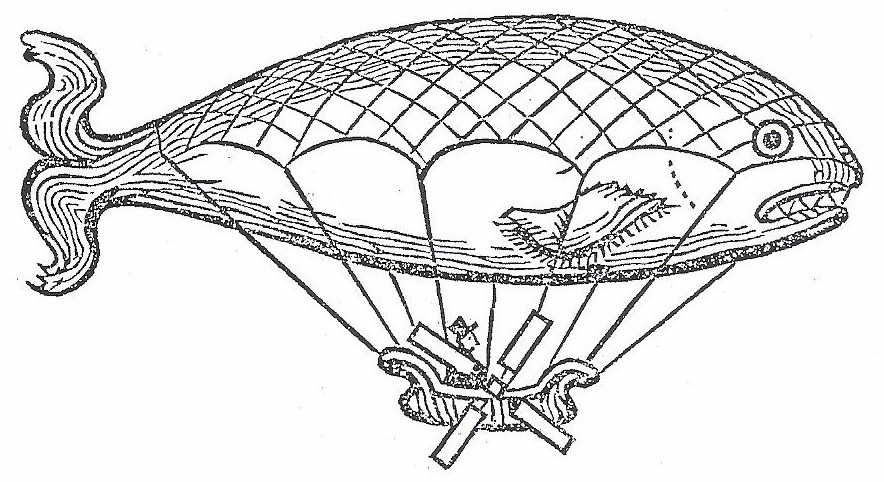
Pauli's first airship (1802)

For many years, he had set himself the goal of creating the world's first human-powered aircraft. The plan of an airship which Pauli drew in the spring of 1802 was in the form of a fish, with an elongated black hull, a vertical red tail fin, and two lateral fins to the left and right of the head to control it; two round, golden-rimmed eyes and a golden mouth gave the vehicle a dream-like and friendly look.

Although the dignitaries of Bern became very enthusiastic about this project, there was still no money to be had from them, so after learning that General Michael Ney in France had donated fifty thousand francs from the French treasury for a similar experiment there, Pauly packed his things and moved to Paris in 1802, never to return.

=== France ===
Under the devout sponsorship and patronage of General Ney, he moved into a beautiful apartment in Paris; under the gallicised name of Jean Pauly, he commissioned Aime Bolle, the city's most famous balloon designer, to build an airship for him in accordance with his plans drawn up in Bern. Its maiden voyage on 22 August 1804 in the castle park of Sceaux was, from a technical point of view at least, quite successful, and a year later, on 4 November 1805, at half past three in the afternoon, the Flying Fish rose again. As Pauly told the readers of the Journal de Paris the next day, it sailed from the Tivoli Park in a moderate easterly wind at the speed of a galloping horse to the Champs-Élysées and the Place de la Concorde, where the aeronaut operated his aerial rudder and managed, according to his own words, five or six minutes against the wind to stay in place and to enjoy the thunderous applause of the onlookers. For the planned return to Tivoli Park, he wrote that, regrettably, he had needed the muscular strength of an additional man, so the Flying Fish drifted west for another eighty kilometers, landing four and a half hours later at dusk, near the Cathedral of Chartres.

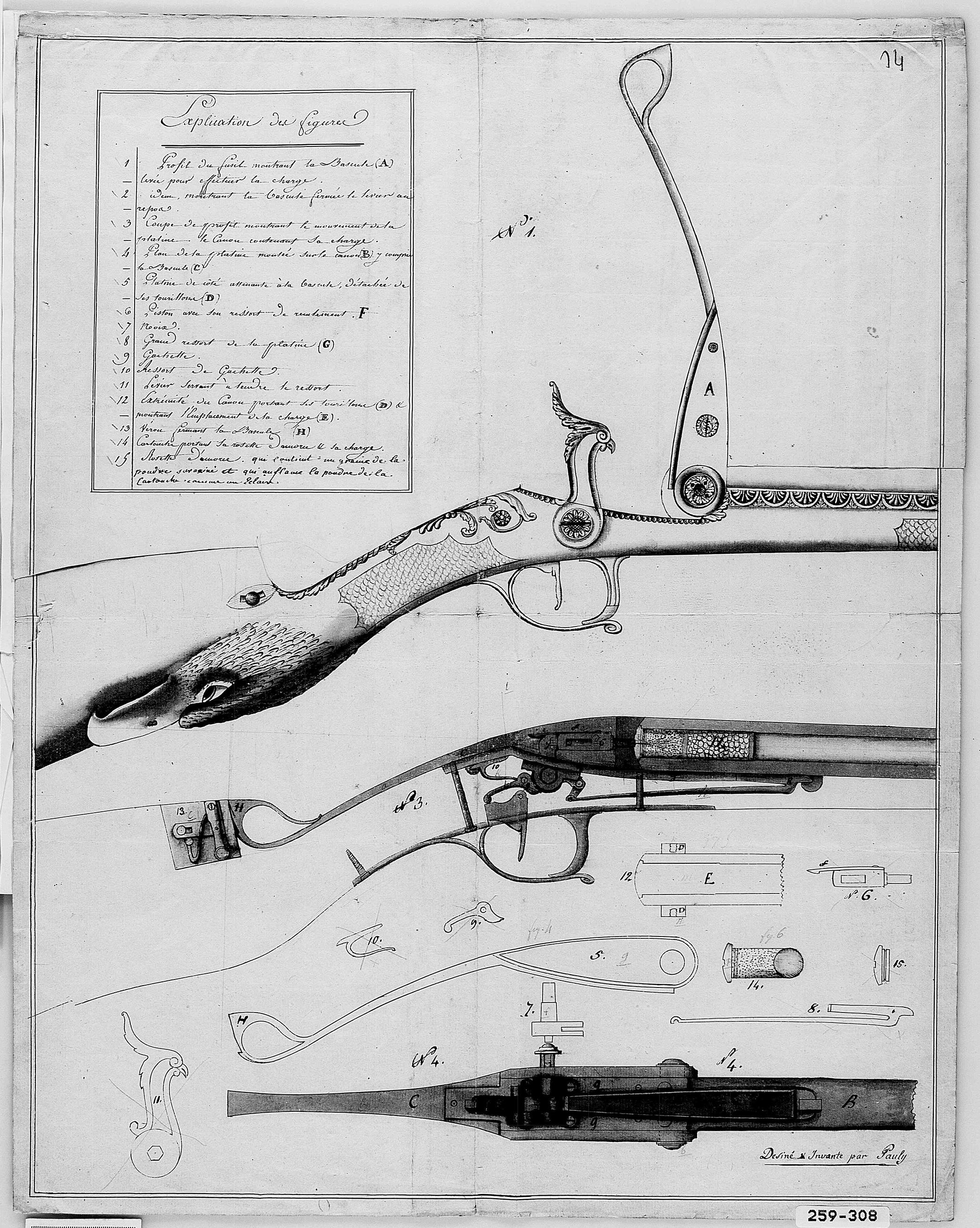
Breech-loading shotgun using self-contained cartridges, from Pauli’s 1812 French patent

Whilst in Paris, Pauly had maintained contact with the weapon manufacturer of Saint-Étienne; using the title "Colonel Jean Samuel Pauly", he established a gunsmith workshop where he designed an automatic bridge and developed mercury fulminate platina. In 1808, in association with French gunsmith François Prélat, Pauly created the first fully self-contained cartridges; these incorporated a copper base with integrated potassium chlorate primer powder (the major innovation of Pauly), a round bullet and either brass or paper casing. Unlike later cartridges, the case walls didn't provide obturation though there was one at the base, similar to the 1855 Pottet cartridge, as the cartridge was loaded through the breech and fired with a needle or a pin; this needle-activated central-fire breech-loading gun would become a major feature of firearms thereafter, and in 1809 Pauly employed the German Johann Nikolaus von Dreyse who would later become the inventor of the famous Dreyse rifle.

The corresponding firearm was also developed by Pauly, who made an improved version which was protected by a patent on 29 September 1812, and the cartridge was further improved by the French gunsmith Casimir Lefaucheux in 1836. It is reported that Napoleon himself said of Pauly's weapons: "Inventions that precede their time remain untapped until general knowledge has reached the same level."

When Paris fell to the hands of Coalition forces on 5 April 1814, von Dreyse left for Prussia, but Pauly left for London with the blueprints of his piscine airship in his luggage.

=== England ===
He settled in Charlotte Street in the heart of London under the anglicised name of Samuel John Pauly, and planned to continue with his flying project under the sponsorship of Durs Egg (an established businessman, personally known to King George III and the Prince of Wales); on 25 April 1815, the King granted the two Swiss men a licence to build an "aerostatic machine in the shape of a fish or bird" with the aim to have it flying within six months.

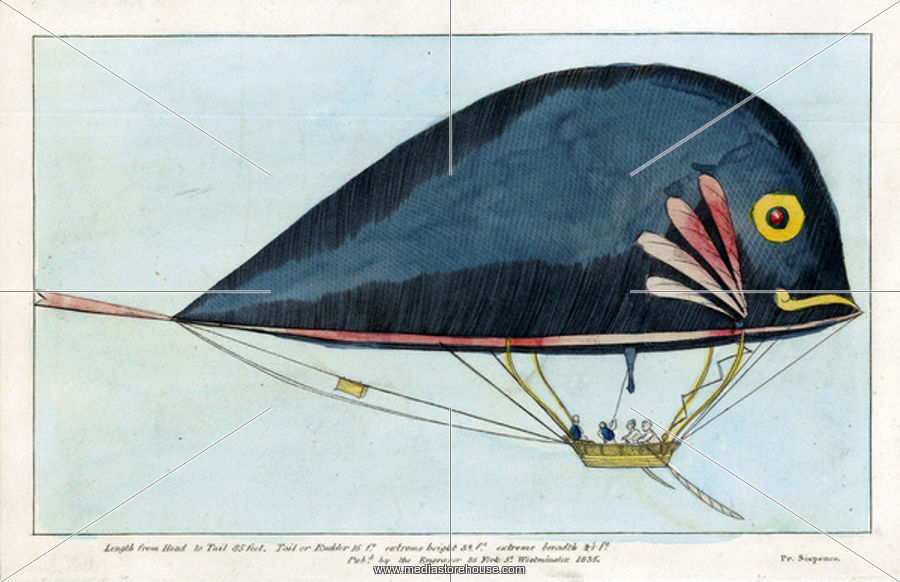
Dolphin airship by Jean Samuel Pauly and Durs Egg c.1817 (from a c.1835 print)

A large building (30 metres in length) with the gates opening from the floor to the roof was built near Hyde Park; this was probably the first hangar in the history of aviation. Seamstresses were hired to sew the outer fish-shaped shell of the hydrogen-filled airship in sevenfold layers from the dried intestines of 70,000 oxen; a second, spherical balloon would provide pressure equalization inside the fish. The 10 metre tailfin serving as the helm was made of silk and whalebone, as were the rudders on the left and right. As for the drive, Pauly had learned from his Paris flights that muscle power alone was not enough, so new to his plans was the lightest possible steam engine.

On 16 August 1816, the London Observer reported that the "Flying Dolphin" was almost complete and would soon begin regular air traffic to Paris, with fifteen to twenty passengers a time. The aircraft was the talk of the town and attracted crowds of onlookers who paid a guinea for the right to take a look inside the hangar and to be a spectator on the maiden flight. When Madame Tussaud's wax museum was touring Manchester, a scale model of the Flying Dolphin hung above the entrance. Egg and Pauly announced that, if the weather was calm on maiden flights, they would steer the fish-shaped balloon "in circles around London", but in strong winds they would take a different course but still return to the starting position.

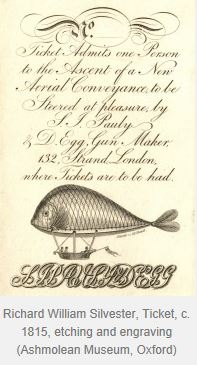
The ticket inviting people to take part in the demonstration of flying in London in 1817.

Unfortunately, the maiden flight never took place, but the nature of the difficulties with which the aeronauts struggled is unknown. Over the defeat, these two Swiss airship pioneers came into conflict and their working relationship fell apart.

During this time of working with Egg, Pauly had not forgotten about his revolutionary firearm design, and, while in England, Pauly took out two more patents for modifications to his gun. The first patent was granted on 4 August 1814 and covered a new design of using compressed air to move a needle into the priming compound quickly so the heat from this would then ignite the priming compound or powder; it also detailed a cannon that used a similar ignition design. The second patent was granted on 14 May 1816 and was an improvement on the first, covering the pistol and additional variations of the gun; it also went into much more detail on the cannon.

Pauly fell into poverty and in c.1821, he died in London and his achievements were forgotten for many years.

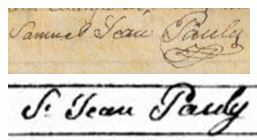
Signature on two documents - court case (1817) and marriage record (1816)

== Marriage and family ==
Samuel John Pauly married Louisa Eliza Eleanor Atkins in St Mary's Church, Lambeth on 4 July 1816 and their daughter, Mary Louisa Veronica Pauly, was baptised there on 7 December 1817. She married Richard Rowsell (1824-1860) and their descendants include the British Olympic cycling champion Joanna Rowsell
