= Pinfire cartridge =

Obsolete 19th century firearm cartridge design

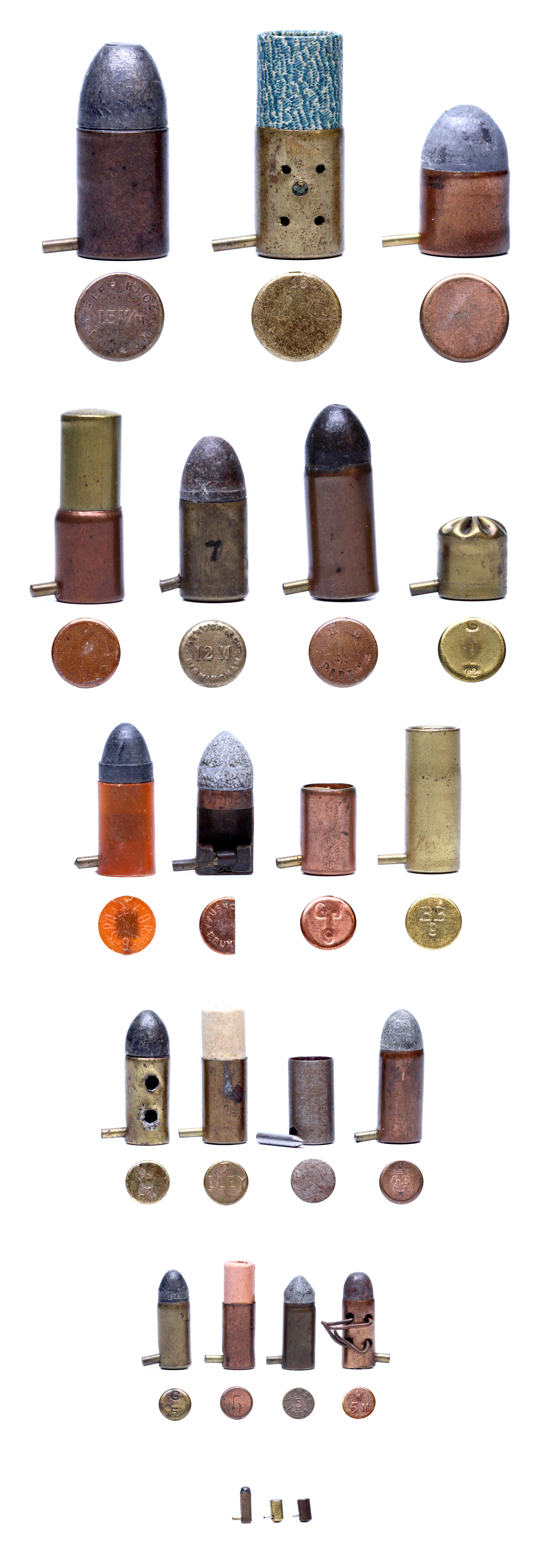
Selection of various types of pinfire cartridges in order from 15mm, 12mm, 9mm, 7mm, 5mm, and 2mm. Description of each cartridge is listed on the image's file page.

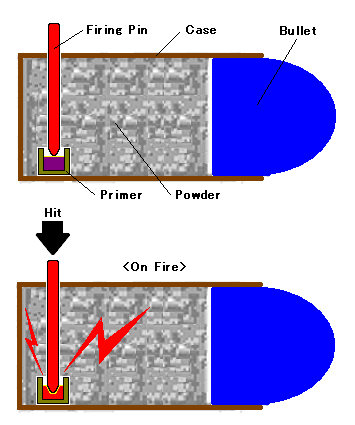
Schematic of a pinfire pistol cartridge

The pin-fire (or pinfire) is an obsolete type of metallic cartridge used in firearms, where the priming compound is ignited by striking a small pin that protrudes radially from above the base of the cartridge (similar in appearance to, and vulnerable to impact like, a Hertz horn on a naval mine). Invented by Frenchman Casimir Lefaucheux in early 1835, it was one of the earliest practical designs of a metallic cartridge to hasten the loading and firing process of a firearm. Its history is closely associated with the development of the breechloader, which would eventually replace all muzzle-loading firearms.

The cartridge featured a small pin that, when struck, would ignite the priming compound and initiate the firing process. Despite initial resistance, especially from British gun users, the pinfire cartridge gained popularity following the Great Exhibition of 1851. Its advantages included easier and faster loading than percussion weapons, and it was more likely to fire reliably when wet. However, with the introduction of reliable rimfire and centerfire cartridges, which were quicker to load and safer, the pinfire cartridge became obsolete, with commercial production stopping after 1914. Today, enthusiasts of vintage weaponry often create pinfire cartridges from modern materials for use in antique firearms.

== History ==
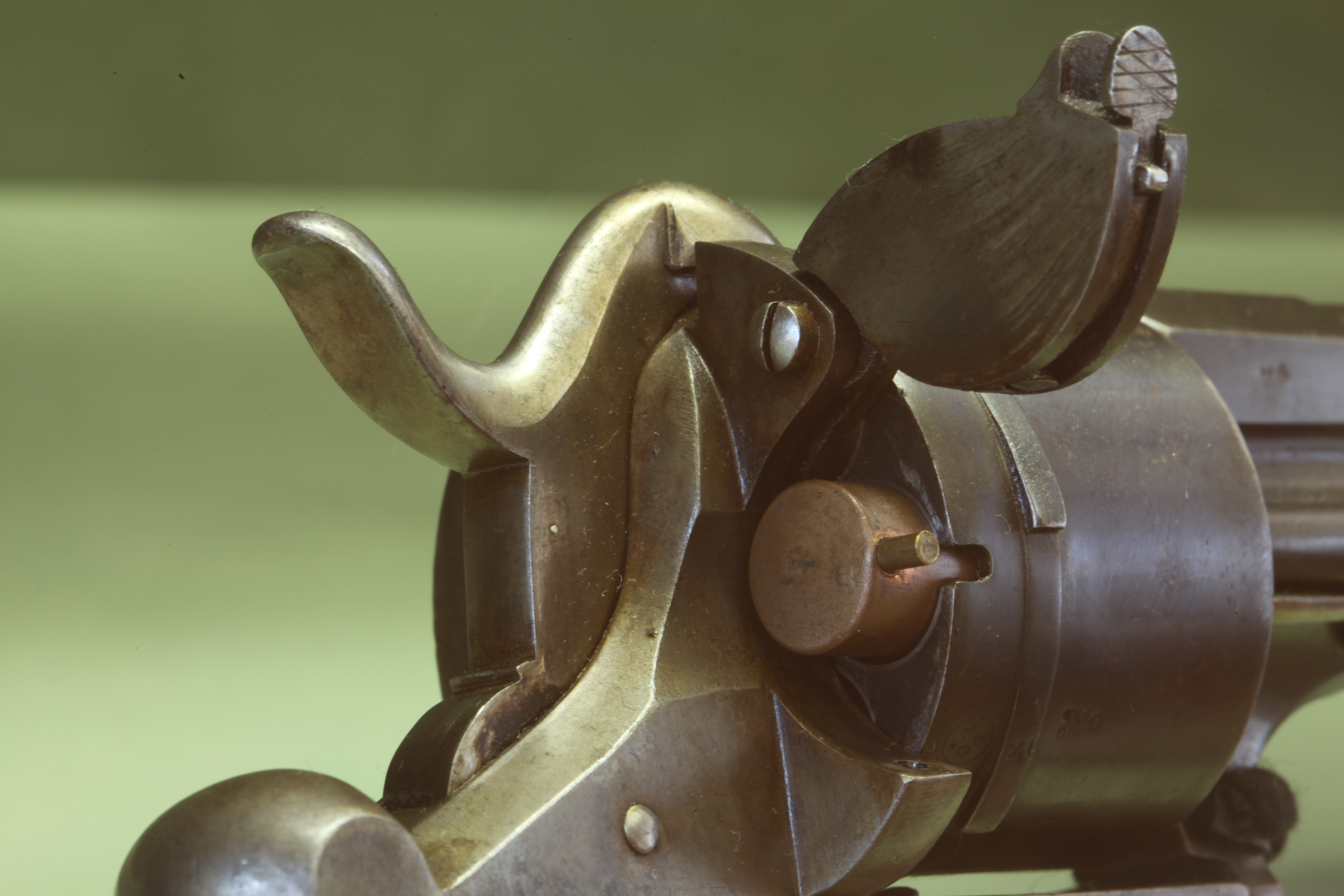
Detail of a Lefaucheux M1858 pistol. Notice the pin protruding from the cartridge.

The Swiss gun maker Samuel Joannes Pauly patented the first breechloading cartridge in 1812. This was for use in a shotgun with fixed barrels which was loaded by lifting a breech block on the top. French gun maker Henri Roux attempted to improve this cartridge in the 1820s but a constantly primed cartridge was felt by many to be too dangerous and many breechloading guns reverted to using an unprimed cartridge. This was fired by a separate percussion cap which was used on the still dominant muzzle-loading guns.

Casimir Lefaucheux of Paris decided in 1832 to patent a breechloader where the barrel hinged downwards to reveal the breech ends. These still used a separate percussion cap. Though used before this, (as seen in surviving pinfire shotshells that lists the names of early gun makers he signed contracts with in 1833 and 1834,) in 1835 he was granted an addition to the 1832 patent for a new type of cartridge in which the cartridge's priming compound is ignited by striking a small pin which protrudes radially from just above the base of the cartridge. These pins fitted into a small groove cut in the top of each barrel-end and made it easy to see if the gun was loaded. The interior side of the chamber served as an anvil so that the cap won't move, which was a problem in some early cartridge designs at the time. The cartridge used metal bases (often brass) with paper tubes which were usually loaded by the shooter or his staff but were not entirely gas-tight. This reduced the force of the charge and allowed powder residue and gas to escape.

The pinfire cartridge was greatly improved by the 1846 patent (number 1963) by Benjamin Houllier of Paris which introduced a base wad and effectively made the cartridge gas-tight which greatly improved the performance. They were cheap and clean shooting. These improved pinfire guns grew in popularity in France and some were imported by British gun makers to overwhelming indifference on the part of the gun users there. They were prejudiced technically against a gun that 'broke' in the middle, despite the much vaunted benefits of breechloading. They owned muzzle-loaders of exquisite perfection, considered themselves the best engineers in the world (inventing the Industrial Revolution), and had a poor view of the French - the old enemy and an unreliable ally.

It was not until the Great Exhibition of 1851 was held in London that breechloading guns were taken more seriously by British and American gun makers in particular. The display of a Lefaucheux breechloading gun inspired English apprentice gunmaker Edwin Charles Hodges (1831–1925) to make an improved copy and persuade leading London gun maker Joseph Lang that this was the gun of the future. Lang was universally credited to be the first established British gunmaker to produce pinfires in any numbers. His first weapon of this new type was produced in 1853. Other British gun makers including Lancaster, Blanch and Reilly were similarly inspired by French originals and improved pinfire breechloaders became the new type of gun which by 1857–1858 every fashionable British prince and titled gentleman wanted to have. EC Hodges continued to make a good living as a specialist independent maker of breechloading actions commissioned by leading gunmakers such as Boss, Lancaster, Egg, Grant, Atkin, Rigby, Dickson, Purdey, Woodward, Army and Navy, and many others.

After Casimir's death in 1852, his son Eugene continued to market the pinfire design with great success. It became increasingly popular in Europe and large numbers of rifles, shotguns, and revolvers (often called Lefaucheux guns after their inventor whoever the maker was), were manufactured from the mid-1850s until the late 1890s. They were quicker and easier to load than percussion weapons with loose black powder, percussion caps and bullet; and they were also much more likely to fire reliably when wet. Pinfire cartridges were available in a large number of sizes for various types of weapon.

While pinfire rifles and shotguns began to decline in use from the early 1860s onward, after the introduction of mass-produced centerfire rifle and shotgun cartridges, pinfire revolvers in particular became very successful and widespread, being adopted by the armies of France, Italy, Spain, Switzerland, Sweden, and others. They were also widely used during the American Civil War, although sometimes despised because of their low-power compared to more common percussion revolvers made by gun manufacturers such as Colt and Smith & Wesson. Some navies also adopted them for "sea service", these examples were often being made out of brass which is largely unaffected by the corrosion, caused by the salt in a maritime environment.

Pinfire became obsolete once reliable rimfire and centerfire cartridges were available by the 1880s; it is unsuited for high-pressure loads since they can blow off the pin, while the protruding pin can cause the ammunition to discharge accidentally if handled carelessly. Due to their low cost, pinfire cartridges were kept in commercial production until 1914, afterwards it was produced in small quantities until the 1930s.

== American manufacturers ==
- Ethan Allen & Co. of Worcester, Massachusetts
- Allen & Wheelock of Worcester, Massachusetts
- C.D. Leet & Co. of Springfield, Massachusetts
- C. Sharps & Co. of Philadelphia, Pennsylvania
- Union Metallic Cartridge Company of Bridgeport, Connecticut
- William Tibbals of South Coventry, Connecticut
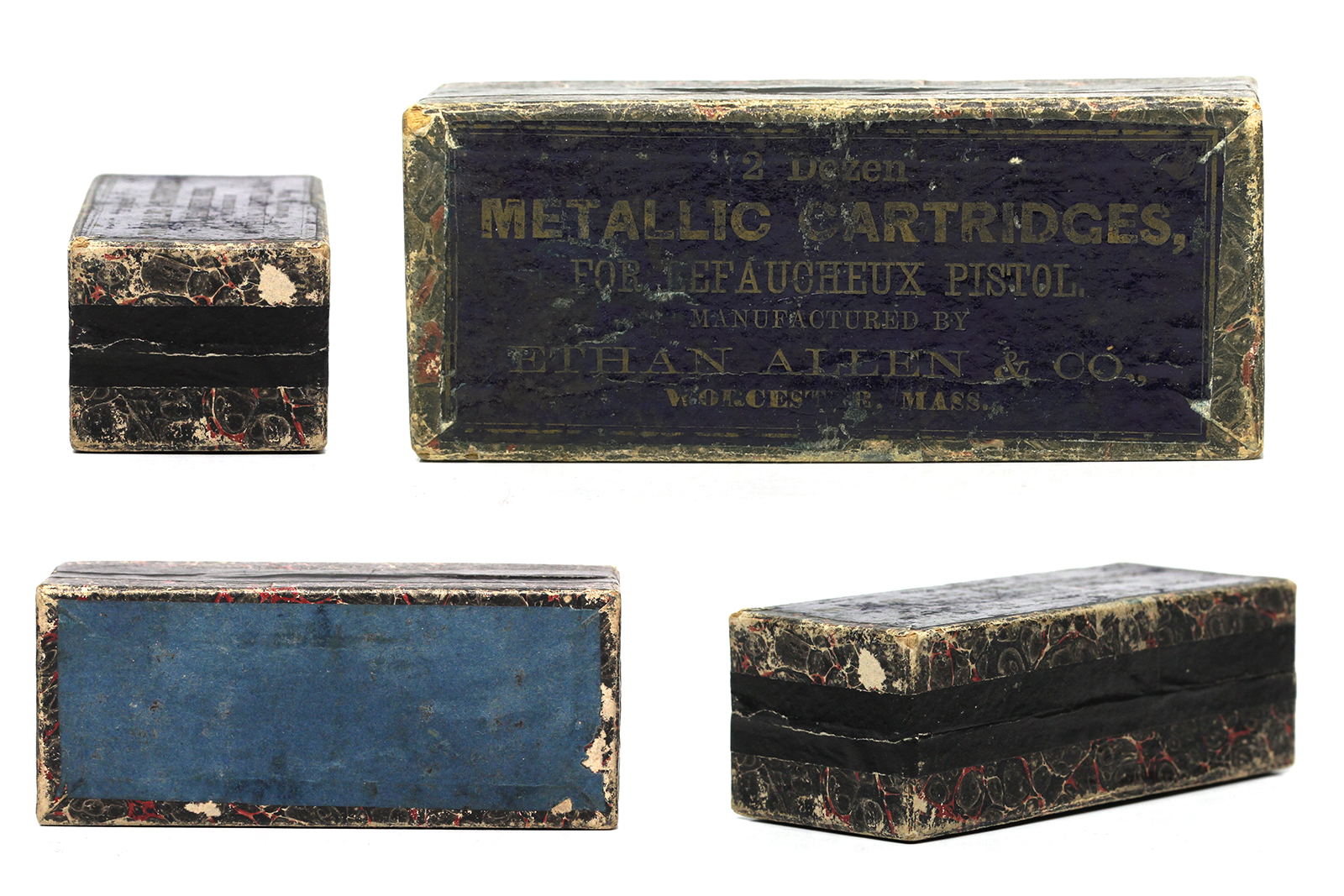
Pinfire Cartridge Box by Ethan Allen & Co.

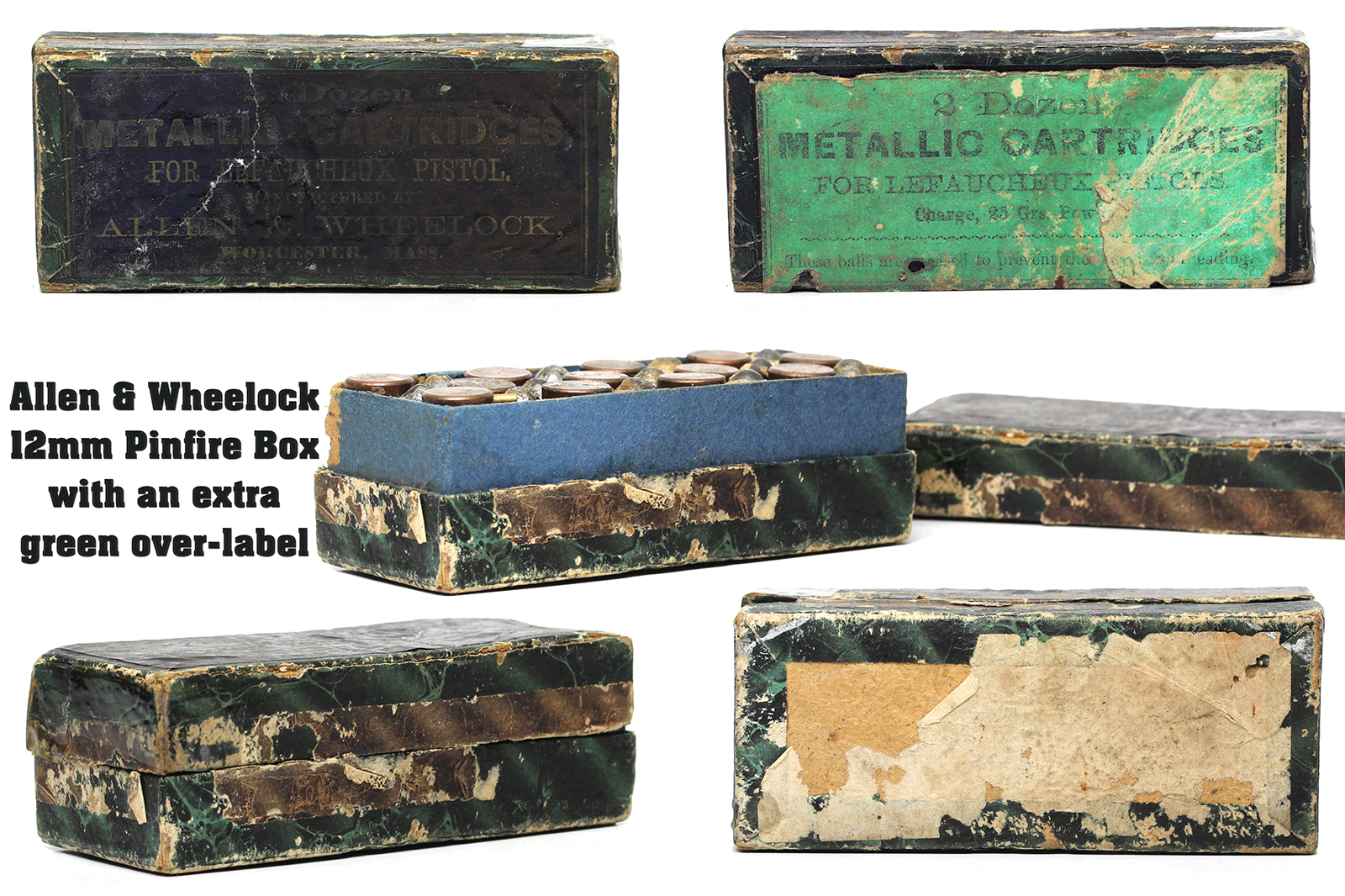
Pinfire Cartridge Box by Allen & Wheelock & Co.

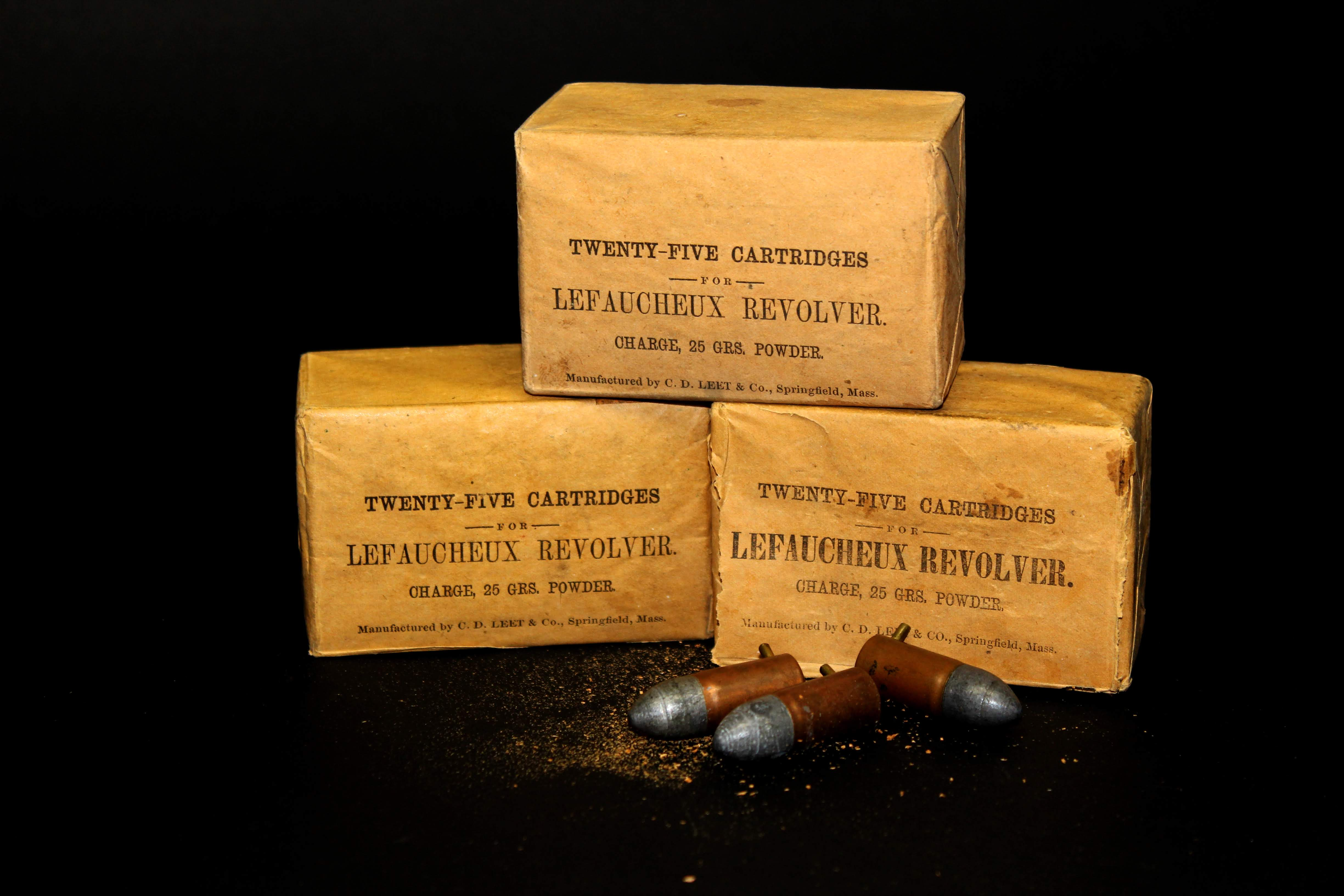
Pinfire Cartridge Box by C.D. Leet & Co.

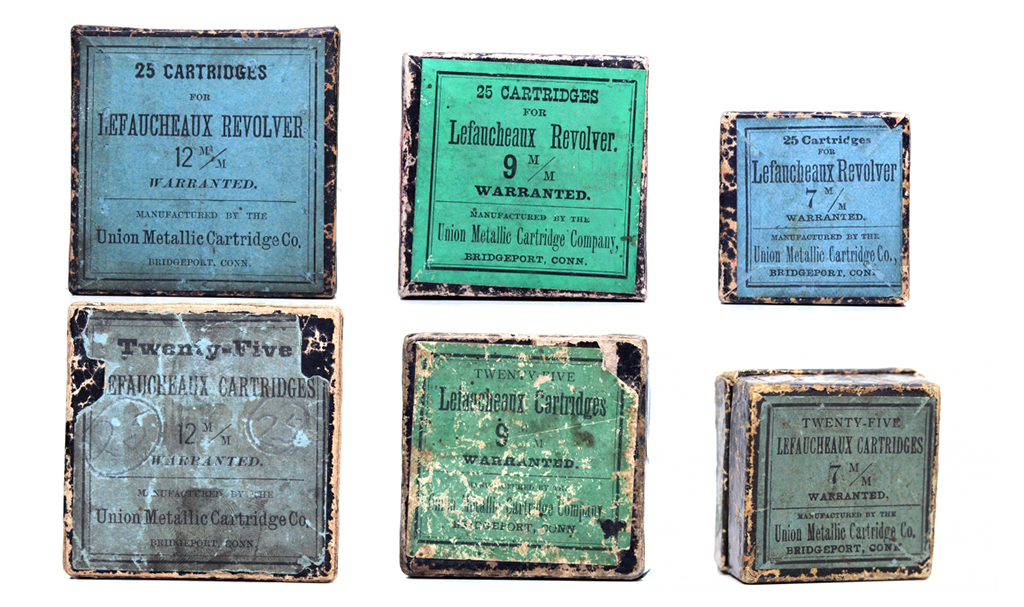
Pinfire Cartridge Boxes by Union Metallic Cartridge Company

== British manufacturers ==
- Eley Brothers of London
- Kynoch & Co. of Birmingham
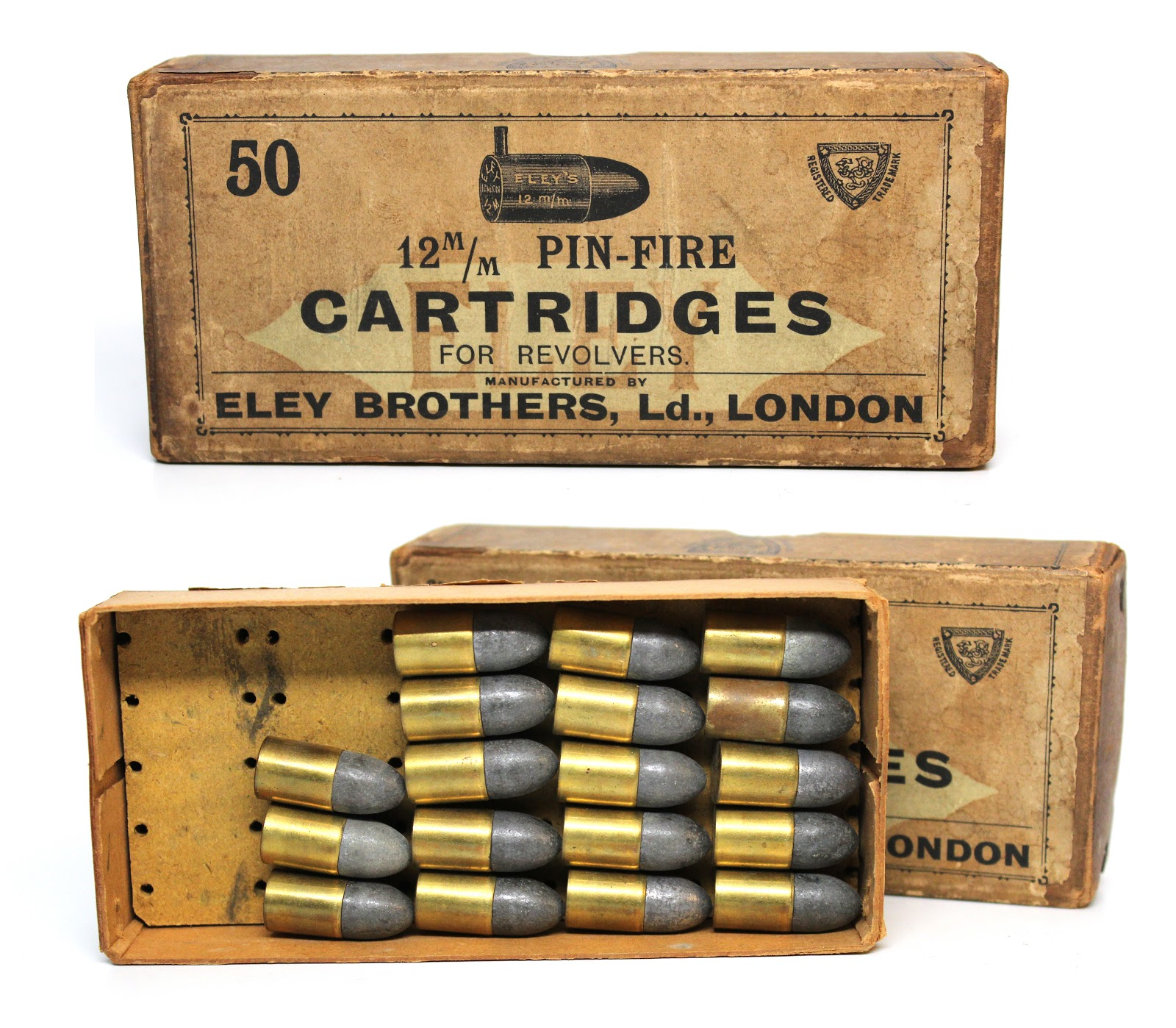
Pinfire Cartridge Box by Eley Brothers

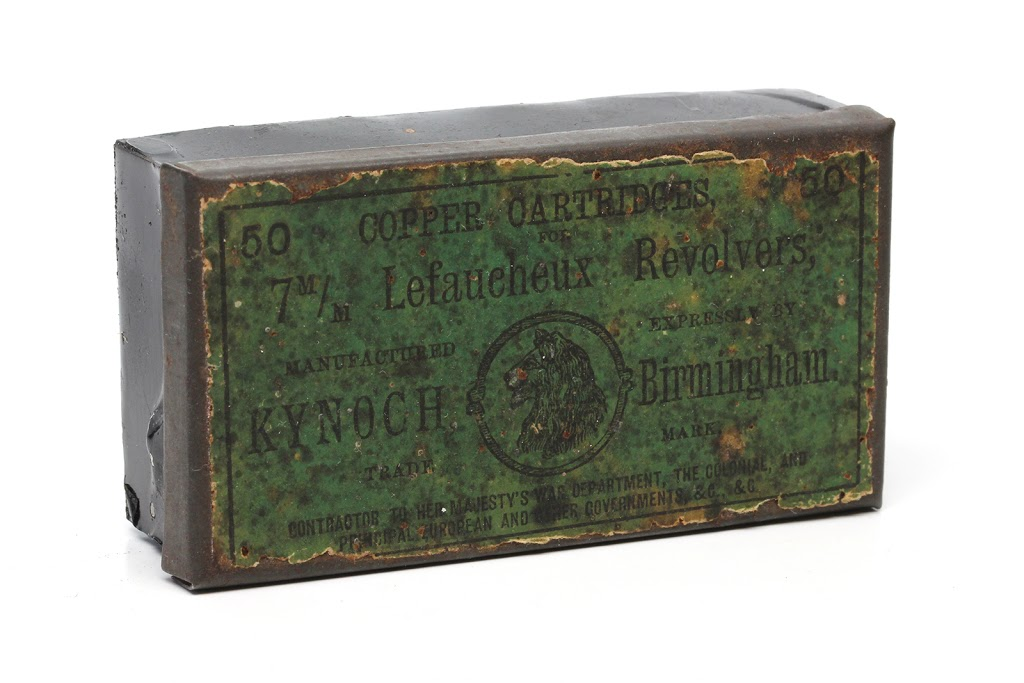
Pinfire Cartridge Box by Kynoch & Co.

== Current status ==
Although pinfire revolver, rifle, and shotgun cartridges are technically obsolete, as pinfire guns have not been made in large numbers since the early 20th century, enthusiasts of vintage weaponry often make pinfire cartridges from modern materials and shoot their old guns. Some modern novelty miniature pinfire pistols are manufactured in calibers as small as 2 to 3 millimeters (.0787 to .118 inches) in diameter. Although not practical weapons, they use pinfire ammunition because the caliber is too small for centerfire or rimfire. Antique pinfire firearms and cartridges are available on the collector market and modern reloading kits exist which contain specialized cartridges which can be hand loaded, though the process is far more complex than loading rimfire or centerfire cartridges.

== See also ==
- Teat-fire cartridge
- List of firearms before the 20th century
- Antique firearms
