= Casimir Lefaucheux =

French gunsmith (1802–1852)

- Born: 26 January 1802; Bonnétable, France
- Died: 9 August 1852 (aged 50); Paris, France
- Occupation: Gunsmith

Casimir Lefaucheux (French: [kazimiʁ ləfoʃø]; 26 January 1802 – 9 August 1852) was a French gunsmith. He was born in Bonnétable, France and died in Paris, France.

Casimir Lefaucheux obtained his first patent in 1827. In 1832, he completed a drop-barrel sporting gun with paper cartridges.

Lefaucheux is credited with the development of one of the first self-contained cartridge systems. This 1835 invention, featuring a pinfire mechanism, followed the work of Jean Samuel Pauly in 1808-1812. The Lefaucheux cartridge had a conical bullet, a cardboard powder tube, and a copper base that incorporated a primer pellet. Lefaucheux thus proposed one of the first breech-loading weapons.

In 1846, Benjamin Houllier improved on the Lefaucheux system by introducing an entirely metallic cartridge of copper brass.

In 1858, the Lefaucheux pistolet-revolver became the first metallic-cartridge revolver to be adopted by a national government, becoming the standard sidearm of the French Navy.

In May 1866, Ferdinand Cohen-Blind attempted to assassinate Otto Von Bismarck with a Pepper-box in Lefaucheux pistol.

A 7 mm Lefaucheux revolver, used by Paul Verlaine to shoot and wound Arthur Rimbaud in 1873, sold for €435,000 at a 2016 Paris auction.

It is thought likely that the gun with which the Dutch painter Vincent van Gogh fatally shot himself in a field in 1890 was a 7 mm Lefaucheux pinfire revolver. The pistol was found, extremely corroded, in 1960 and is on display at the Van Gogh Museum in Amsterdam.

== Gallery ==
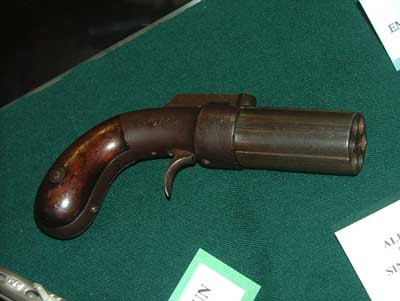
1838 pepperbox pistol French pinfire revolver

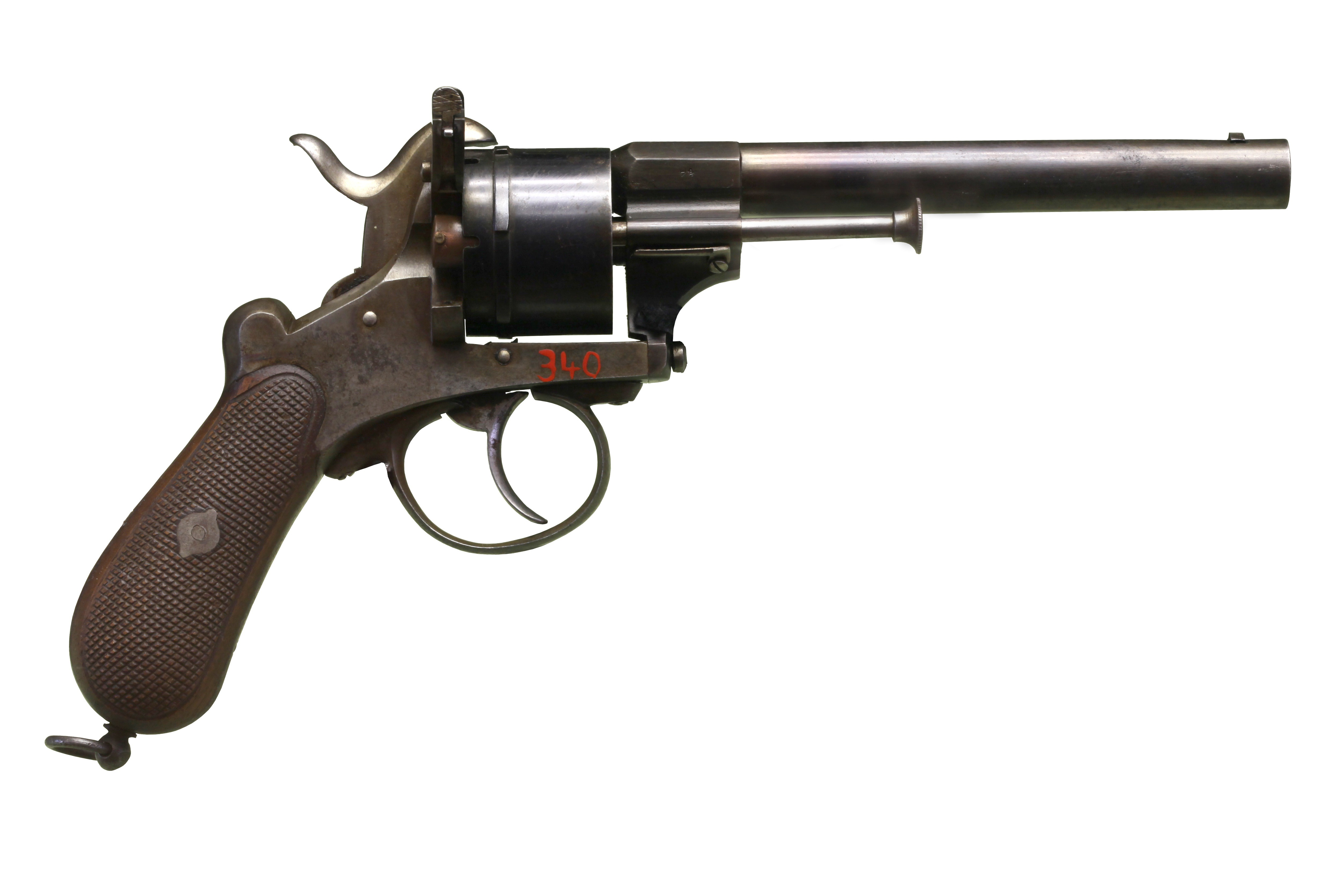
Belgian-made Lefaucheux service revolver, c. 1860–1865

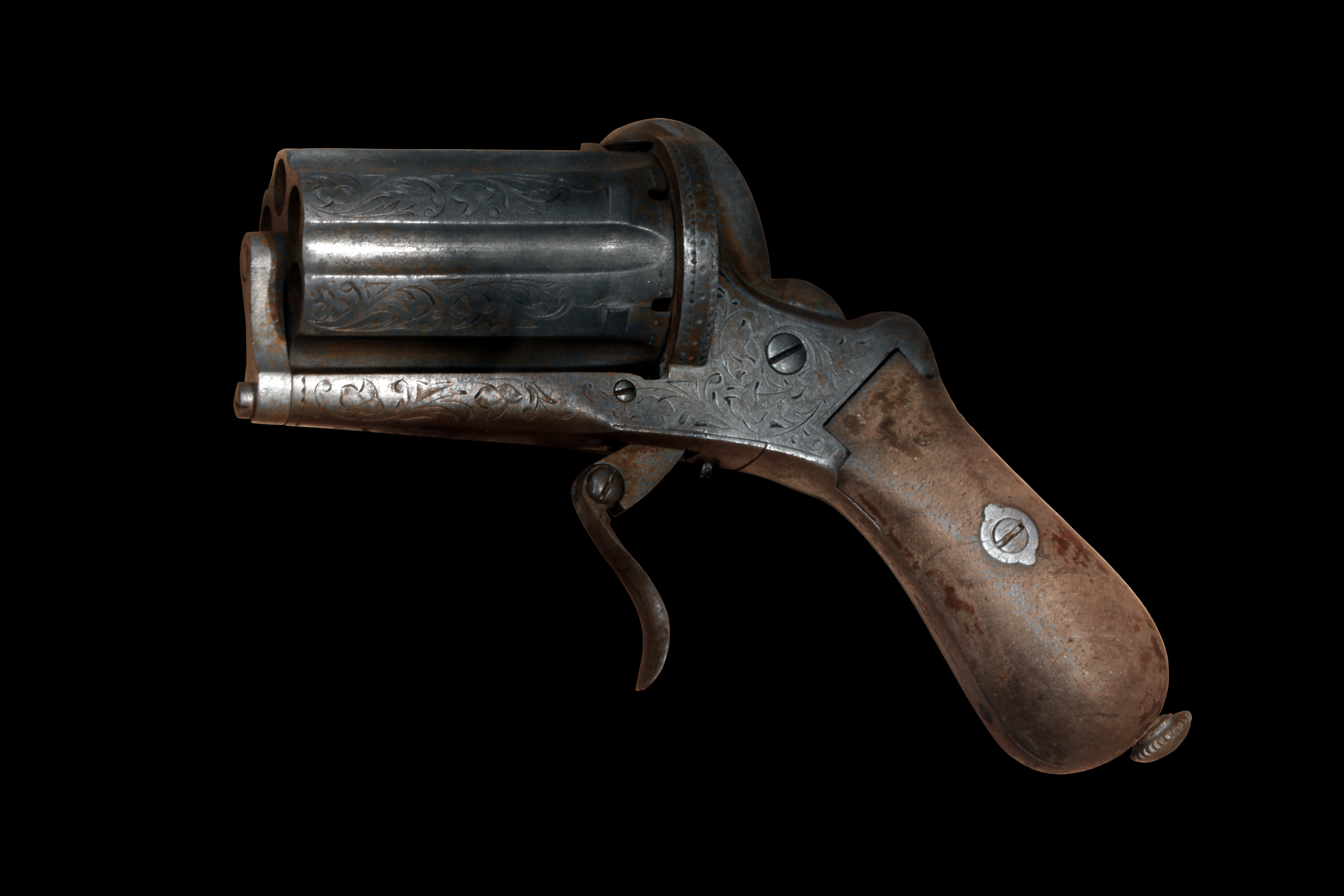
Pepper-box in Lefaucheux system-used in 1866 assassination attempt on Otto Von Bismarck

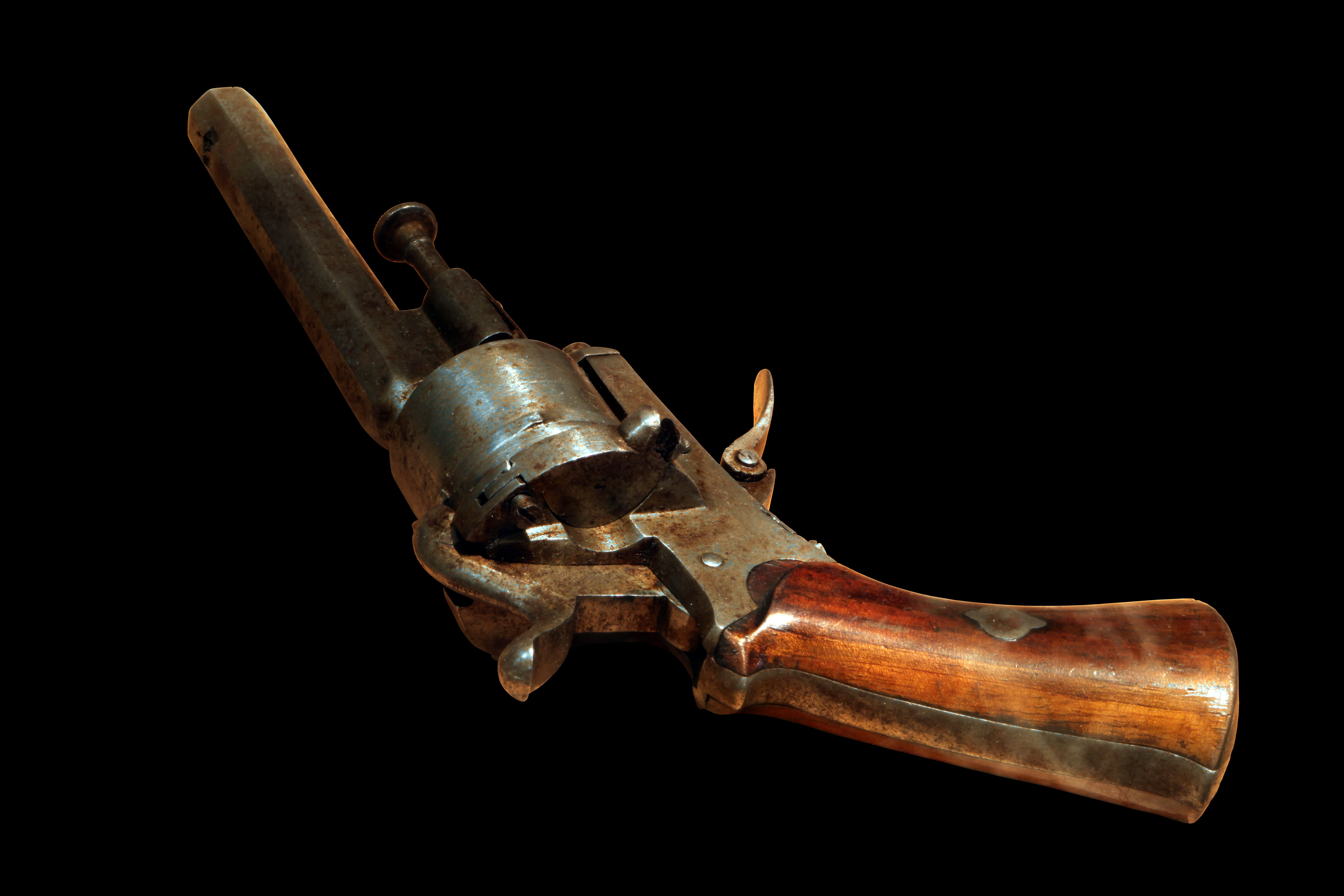
Pocket revolver in Lefaucheux system

Comparison of a pepperbox with a percussion pistol
