= Francotte =

Belgian manufacturer of firearms and ammunition

Auguste Francotte & Companie, Liege
- Type: Private
- Industry: Manufacturing
- Founded: 1810; 216 years ago
- Founders: Charles Francotte; August Francotte
- Defunct: after 1948
- Headquarters: Liege, Belgium
- Products: Firearms and ammunition

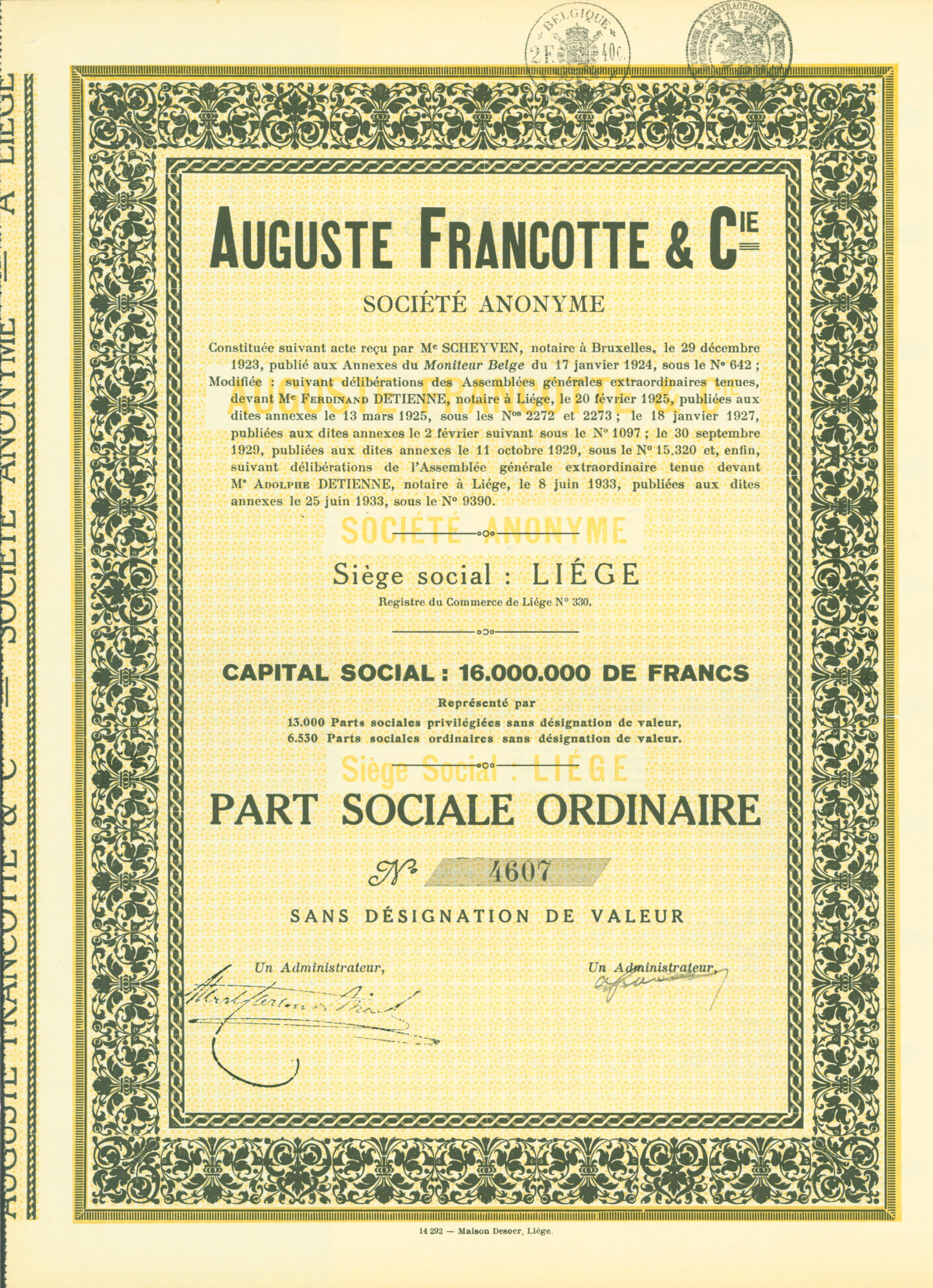
Certificate of the Auguste Francotte & Cie., issued 25 June 1933

Auguste Francotte & Comp. (French: Auguste Francotte & Companie, Liege) was a privately owned firearms manufacturer based in Liège, Belgium. It was founded between 1805. and 1810, and was still in operation after 1948.

== History ==
The company was founded in 1805 by August Francotte in Liège, based at Rue de Mont-Saint-Martin 61. The company was especially active from 1860 to 1914 before manufacturing ceased due to the German invasion of Belgium. The company resumed production after World War I.

=== Arms for Serbian military ===
In 1857, the Principality of Serbia ordered rifles (Francotte rifle model 1849/56) and pistols of percussion cap system for its armed forces. Also, in 1875, Serbia procured 11 mm Lefaucheux-Francotte M. 1871 revolvers of double action, similar to a Danish revolver Lefaucheux-Francotte M1865.

=== Arms for Sardinian military ===
Francotte converted Royal Sardinian Army Model 1844 rifled musket in the 1860s for the Italian Wars of Unification. Subsequently, 10,000 units were procured by the U.S. Ordnance Department under Sample 15, with the majority distributed to Union troops in the Western Theater.

== Production ==
Throughout the period from the middle of the nineteenth century to 1914, Belgian gunmakers like Auguste Francotte made large quantities of rifles and revolvers of the most diverse construction, calibre and size; most, however, were imitations (produced under licence) of other well-known systems (Martini-Henry, Mauser, Smith&Wesson, Nagant).

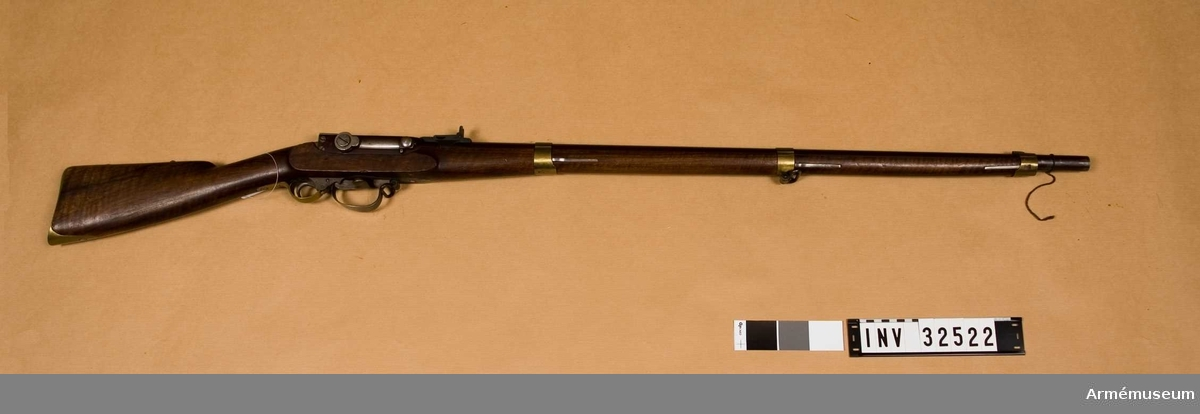
Kammerlader m/1857 produced by A.Francotte.

During the first decades they manufactured various arms for various nations around Europe, among others 1,500 M1857 kammerladers for Norway. Later they concentrated on high-quality, expensive civilian arms.

=== Rifles ===
- Francotte-Martini rifle, single shot breachloader with falling block action. Made after 1865, it was an unlicenced derivative of the Peabody rifle. Modern versions are of the hammerless type, and have a removable breechblock, which can be easily removed for cleaning. It is a very well made and expensive weapon.

=== Revolvers ===
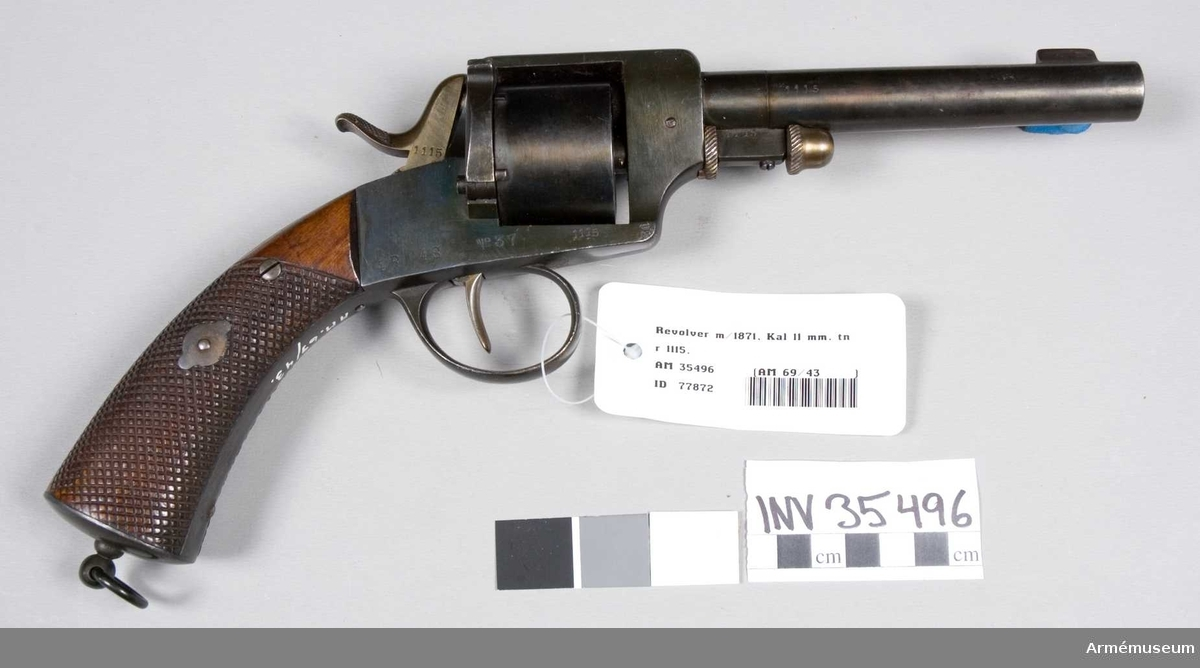
- Lefaucheux-Francotte M. 71, made for Swedish and Serbian Army.
  Model 1865, Chamelot-Delavigne double action pinfire revolver with solid frame and fixed cylinder, with no mechanical extractor. Made for Danish navy, caliber 11 mm.
- Model 1871, Lefaucheux-Francotte double action pinfire revolver with solid frame and fixed cylinder, with no mechanical extractor. Made for Danish army, caliber 11 mm.
- Revolver m/1871, Lefaucheux-Francotte double action revolver with solid frame and fixed cylinder, with no mechanical extractor. Made for Swedish army, caliber 11 mm.
- Model 1882 (trooper's model), similar as above, made for Danish army, caliber 10.9 mm.
- Model 1886 (trooper's model), similar as above, made for Danish army, caliber 9.5 mm.
