= Russian musket model 1845 =

Percussion flintlock musket

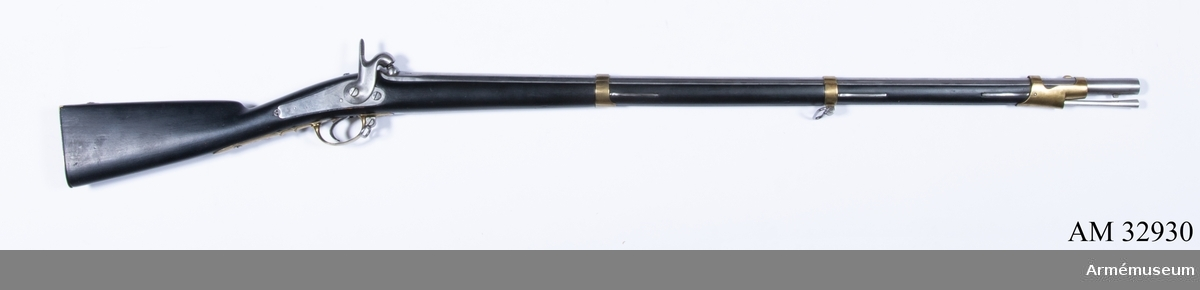
- Russian percussion musket model 1845, Military Museum in Stockholm.
- Type: percussion musket
- Place of origin: Russian Empire

Service history
- In service: 1845–1880
- Used by: Russian Empire; United States (limited); Principality of Serbia
- Wars: Crimean War; American Indian Wars; Serbian–Ottoman Wars

Production history
- Designed: 1845-1863
- No. built: (Principality of Serbia) 31,000-39,200
- Variants: Russian rifle model 1845/63 (Serbian conversion)

Specifications
- Length: 1.48 m
- Barrel length: 1.05 m
- Caliber: 17.78-18.1 mm
- Rate of fire: 2-3 rounds/min
- Feed system: Muzzle-loading

Musket model 1845 (Serbian: Руска пушка, Ruska puška), was a Russian percussion musket used in the mid-Nineteenth century. The firearm originated in the Russian Empire, but is best known for the modified rifled Model 1845/63 used extensively by the Serbian army in 1863–1878. The M1845 was developed based on the French M1842 musket.

Russia primarily used the musket in Crimean conflict. Nessler ball usage was noted, as Russian forces adopted it after testing bullets seized from French soldiers near Sevastopol; the effective range of smoothbores doubled from ~300 to ~600 paces (~270–550 m), though accuracy gains were modest—it was primarily a range and velocity improvement, marking the last significant improvement to the Russian soldier's smoothbore musket before the transition to the six-line rifled weapons.

== History ==
=== Background, 1830-1863 ===
Principality of Serbia gained its autonomy from the Ottoman Empire after the Second Serbian Uprising (1815), and officially became an Ottoman client state under the Russian protectorate in 1830. The first Serbian regular military units were formed by Prince Miloš Obrenović in 1825, formally as a police force called Enlisted Watchmen (Serbian: Уписни пандури, Upisni panduri), in order not to offend the Ottoman authoritees. At first, there were 12 companies (1,147 men) of these mercenaries (Serbian: Солдати, Soldati). In 1830. Serbia was officially permitted by the Ottomans to form an army, and by 1838. Serbia had 2,417 professional (regular) soldiers, armed and uniformed in the European fashion, trained by the former Austrian and Russian officers. Regular army was temporarily disbanded by the new Serbian Government in 1839 (after the exile of Prince Miloš), but was reformed in 1845. under the name of Garrison Soldiers (Serbian: Гарнизоно воинство, Garnizono voinstvo): there were 2 battalions of infantry (8 companies, 2,010 men), an artillery unit (250 men) and a squadron of cavalry (208 men), with the officers about 2,529 men.

The regular army was inadequate to protect the country from its more powerful neighbours (Austria and Ottoman Empire), during the crisis of Hungarian Revolution of 1848; Serbia was directly threatened by the Austrian invasion. The Serbian government mandatorily conscripted all available men for the military service, the "People's Militia" (Serbian: Народна војска, Narodna Vojska). On paper, Serbia raised a force of 94,000 men (16,000 horsmen), with 40,000 more in reserve, but arms and food were insufficient. Conscripts were expected to provide their own weapons and clothing, receiving only food and ammunition from the government. More than half lacked working rifles, which were mostly old flintlock muskets of Ottoman and Austrian production.

=== Russian rifles in Serbia ===
In 1856-1858 Serbia imported the first 7.000 modern percussion rifles, Francotte rifle model 1849/56 from Belgium: in 1858, the fall of pro-Austrian government of Prince Aleksandar Karađorđević caused the Austrian government to immediately prohibit any further transport of weapons for Serbia.

In 1858, Prince Miloš Obrenović returned to power in Serbia with the support of France and Russia, who were dissatisfied with the pro-Austrian policy of the Serbian government. His son and heir, Prince Mihailo (ruled 1860–67), led a very ambitious foreign policy, aimed at the liberation of all the South-Slavic peoples. In 1861. Prince Mihailo founded Ministry of War (led by French colonel Hyppolyte Mondain), doubled the size of the Regular Army (to 3,529 men) and declared the foundation of the Serbian National Militia (Serbian: Народна војска, Narodna vojska), which conscripted all the men aged 20–50 for the compulsory military service. People's Militia was divided into the First (men under the age of 35) and the Second class, organized into territorial battalions (62 in number) and regiments (17, one in each county). There were also 17 squardons of cavalry, 17 pioneer units of 60 men each, and 6 artillery batteries (1,200 men). Conscripts served without pay and were expected to provide their own weapons and clothing. Militiamen were expected to provide their own weapons and clothing. In 1862. Serbian People's Militia existed on paper only: less than a half of the militiamen had serviceable rifles. However, in 1863. Serbia received some 31.000 (or 39.200) old percussion muskets from Russia (Russian musket model 1845): these muskets were converted to rifles in Kragujevac and became the standard weapon of the People's Militia.

=== Russian firearm in United States ===
The 1862 Congressional Report on imported arms indicates that the U.S. government procured approximately 22,000 Russian weapons early in the American Civil War, primarily during December 1861. While these are conventionally classified as large-caliber, smooth-bore arms, historical discrepancies in arms categorization—often grouping items by appearance rather than origin—suggest that some of these imports may have actually been Luttich rifles. Consequently, the Ordnance Department might have misidentified these rifles as Belgian or British based on existing maker marks or visual similarities.

Regarding the procurement of Russian infantry muskets by the American government during the Civil War, historical records indicate that Russia did not export significant quantities of small arms during the 1850s and 1860s, and its domestic models, such as the Model 1845 and subsequent percussion conversions, were not represented in documented U.S. import streams. Conversely, the U.S. acquired substantial volumes of Prussian weaponry, particularly older smoothbore and converted percussion muskets, frequently sourced as mixed lots of European surplus. Tula muskets are rarely encountered within the U.S. collector market.
