= Armed Forces of the Principality of Serbia =

Military forces of the Principality of Serbia (1830–1882)

- Војска Кнежевине Србије
- National flag and ensign
- Founded: 1830
- Current form: Serbian Armed Forces
- Disbanded: 1882
- Headquarters: Paraćin (June 1876)

Leadership
- Supreme Commander: Miloš Obrenović (1830–1839, 1858–1860); Aleksandar Karađorđević (1842–1858); Mihailo Obrenović (1839–1842, 1860–1868); Milan I (1868–1882)

Personnel
- Active personnel: 1,147 (1830); 1,417 (1838); 2,529 (1858); 3,529 (1862); 5,000 (1876); 124,000 (June 1876) (Note: Not including volunteer corps of about 5,000 men from neighbouring areas.)
- Reserve personnel: National Militia (90,000–120,000)

The Armed Forces of the Principality of Serbia (Serbian Cyrillic: Оружане снаге Кнежевине Србије, romanized: Oružane snage Kneževine Srbije) or Army of the Principality of Serbia (Serbian Cyrillic: Војска Кнежевине Србије, romanized: Vojska Kneževine Srbije), was the armed forces of the Principality of Serbia.

Founded in 1830, it became a standing army taking part in the Serbian–Ottoman Wars of 1876–1878, the first conflict in the nation modern history, after which the country gained its full independence. It was succeeded by the Royal Serbian Army.

== Establishment ==
A small Serbian army was established in 1830 after the Russian victory over the Ottomans in the Russo-Turkish War (1828–29), and the signing of the Treaty of Adrianople (1829), which re-guaranteed the autonomy of Serbia as per the earlier Akkerman Convention of 1826. Serbia's professional army came out of the personal guard that Prince Miloš Obrenović created in 1830. The first army law of 1839 established that force to 4,000 men and 63 officers. Most officers had attended military schools in Russia, France or Austria. A military academy known as the Artillery School was created on 18 September 1850, its first students graduated in 1855.

After Mihailo Obrenović became Prince following his brother's abdication in 1861, he created a National Militia (Narodna Vojska). Serbia's People Army added up to 125,000 men in July 1876 at the start of the First Serbian–Ottoman War.

Serbian officers participated in the Serb uprising of 1848–49 and the Herzegovina uprising (1875–1877).

== History ==
=== Army under Prince Miloš Obrenović (1830–1838) ===
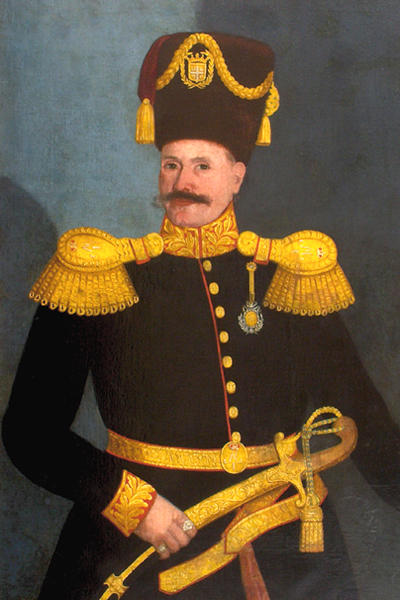
Portrait of General Jovan Obrenović in dress uniform, 1836

The Principality of Serbia gained its autonomy from the Ottoman Empire following the Second Serbian uprising (1815). In 1830 the Principality officially became an Ottoman client state under Russian protectorate. The first Serbian regular military units were formed by Prince Miloš Obrenović in 1825, formally as a police force called Enlisted Watchmen (Serbian: Уписни пандури, Upisni panduri), in order not to offend the Ottoman authorities. At first, there were 12 companies (1,147 men) of these mercenaries (Serbian: Солдати, Soldati). In 1830. Serbia was officially permitted by the Ottomans to form an army, and by 1838. Serbia had 2,417 professional (regular) soldiers, armed and uniformed in the European fashion, trained by the former Austrian and Russian officers. Serbian army had 2 battalions (8 companies) of infantry, two units of artillery (4 batteries), a squadron of cavalry and military musicians – in all, 40 officers, 144 NCOs, 208 cavalry, 195 cannoniers and 1,830 infantrymen. In 1838. Serbia formed the first Military Headquarters and Military commissariat.

=== Army under Prince Aleksandar Karađorđević (1842–1858) ===
Regular army was temporarily disbanded by the new Serbian Government, led by the leading bureaucrats (Serbian: Ustavobranitelji) who exiled Prince Miloš im 1839, but was reformed in 1845. under the name of Garrison Soldiers (Serbian: Гарнизоно воинство, Garnizono voinstvo): there were 2 battalions of infantry (8 companies, 2,010 men), an artillery unit (250 men), a squadron of cavalry (208 men) and 50 musicians, with the officers in all about 2,529 men.

As the Regular Army was too small to protect the country from its powerful neighbours (Austria and Ottoman Empire), during the crisis of Hungarian Revolution of 1848, when Serbia was directly threatened by the Austrian invasion, Serbian government resorted to enlistment of all the men available for the military service, the so-called People's Militia (Serbian: Народна војска, Narodna vojska). At the time Serbia was (on paper) able to rise 94,000 men (16,000 horsmen), with 40,000 more in reserve, but there was not enough arms nor food for so many. Conscripts were expected to provide their own weapons and clothing, receiving only food and ammunition from the government. In reality, not even half of them had working rifles, mostly old flintlock muskets of the Ottoman and Austrian production.

In 1856–1858 Serbia imported the first 7.000 modern percussion rifles, Francotte rifle model 1849/56 from Belgium.

=== The first military schools and factories ===
To modernize Serbian army, in 1848. Serbian Government built the first Cannon Foundry (Serbian: Тополивница, Topolivnica) and State Arsenal in Belgrade, with the main production facilities in Kragujevac. In 1850. government founded Artillery School in Belgrade, which was the foundation of the Serbian Military Academy. After the Russian defeat in Crimean War (1853–1856), Serbia was made a joint protectorate of Russia, Austria, France and United Kingdom by the treaty of Paris (1856).

In 1855. the Cannon Foundry in Kragujevac opened a rifle-production department, working on adaptation of old flintlock muskets to percussion system, with the capacity of 60 muskets a day. The same year two machines for making Minnie balls were imported from Belgium, and in 1857 Kragujevac Foundry installed the machines for production of copper percussion caps, making Serbia finally independent in the production of percussion rifle ammunition. In 1858 a new production line with 28 skilled workers under the guidance of Mihailo Cvejić was set up for converting some 15,000 old flintlock muskets to percussion system: in the first year only some 1,800 rifles were converted, then the production increased to 1,000 adapted rifles a month, so by 1863 the Serbian army had some 15,000 converted percussion muskets.

=== Army under Prince Mihailo Obrenović (1860–1868) ===
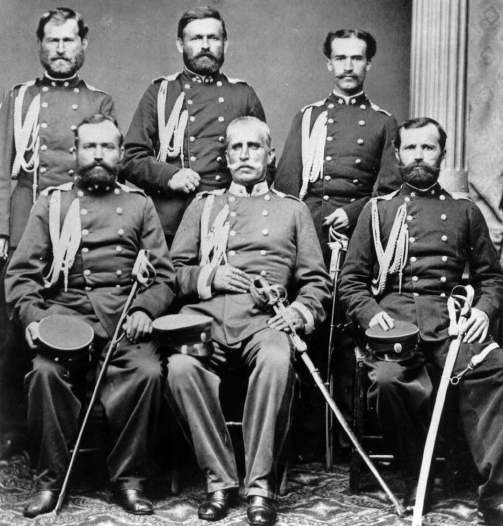
Group of Serbian officers, c. 1865

In 1858, Prince Miloš Obrenović returned to power in Serbia with the support of France and Russia, who were dissatisfied with the pro-Austrian policy of the Serbian government. His son and heir, Prince Mihailo (ruled 1860–67), led a very ambitious foreign policy, aimed at the liberation of all the South-Slavic peoples. In 1861. Prince Mihailo founded Ministry of War (led by French colonel Hyppolyte Mondain), doubled the size of the Regular Army (to 3,529 men) and declared the foundation of the Serbian National Militia (Serbian: Народна војска, Narodna vojska), which conscripted all the men aged 20–50 for the compulsory military service. People's Militia was divided into the First (men under the age of 35) and the Second class, organized into territorial battalions (62 in number) and regiments (17, one in each county). There were also 17 squadrons of cavalry, 17 pioneer units of 60 men each, and 6 artillery batteries (1,200 men). The First class could field about 50,000 men, the Second about 40,000. Every county had its own military department, with several regular officers and NCOs, who organized recruitment, supplies, armament and training of National Militia. Military training was done on Sundays and holidays: battalions trained for 2 days every other week, and regiments 15 days a year. NCOs and officers under the rank of captain were selected from the common people, mostly peasants, by the county elders, battalion and squadron commanders were selected by the Minister of War, and regiment commanders were appointed by the Prince. Military service was without pay, and militiamen were expected to provide their own weapons and clothing.

In 1862. Serbian People's Militia existed on paper only: less than a half of the militiamen had serviceable rifles. However, in 1863. Serbia received some 31,000 (or 39,200) old percussion muskets from Russia (Russian musket model 1845): these muskets were converted to rifles in Kragujevac and became the standard weapon of the National Militia. In 1866. new military schools were opened in Beograd and Kragujevac, to provide Militia officers with basic training in tactics, fortification and topography. In 1867. the first Serbian breechloading rifles (Green model 1867) were made in Belgrade Arsenal, converting some 27,000 Austrian decommissioned Lorenz rifles.

=== Army under Prince Milan Obrenović (1868–1882) ===
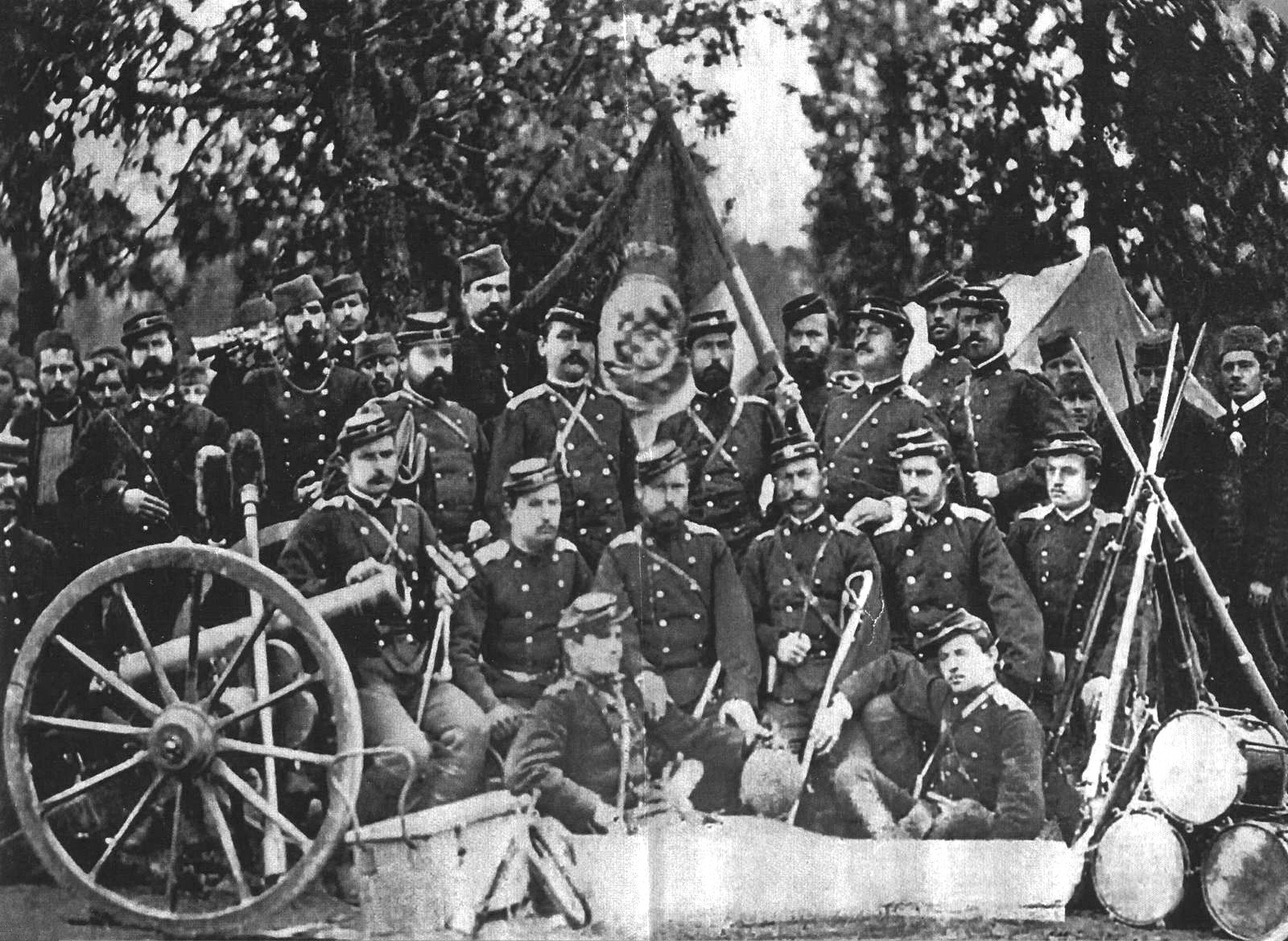
Camp of the Armed Forces of the Principality of Serbia during Serbian–Ottoman Wars, 1876

During the reign of Prince Milan Obrenović (1868–1889, King of Serbia since 1882), modernization of the Serbian army continued. In 1870, the Serbian army adopted new, much better breechloading rifles (Peabody model 1870), converting some 28,000 Belgian percussion rifles. In 1874, the. Regular Army was raised to a division (4 battalions of infantry, 1 artillery brigade, 1 battalion of engineers, 2 cavalry squadrons and telegraph command, in all 5,000 men), National Militia was formed in brigades (18 in total, one for each county) and more educated officers were hired. Serbian army had 317 officers (5 colonels, 12 lieutenant-colonels, 20 majors and only one general, Milivoje Petrović Blaznavac).

For the war against the Turks in 1876–1878, in 1876. Serbia mobilized 158 infantry battalions of the First (men aged 20–35) and the Second class (men aged 35–50), 18 battalions of the Third class (men over 50), 18 squadrons of cavalry, 44 batteries with some 210 cannons (only one battery of modern Krupp breachloaders), 6 engineer and 6 medic companies, in all some 130,000 men, 22,000 horses and 6,000 oxen. It was a tremendous effort for the country of 1,300,000 inhabitants.

In 1876, Serbian armament was already obsolete: only the First class soldiers were fully armed with breechloading rifles (in fact converted muzzleloaders Peabody model 1870), and the Second class only partially (with Green model 1867), while the rest were armed with old percussion rifles and even flintlock muskets (Third class). During the war, more than 6,000 Green rifles were converted to Peabody action: however, in 1877. Serbian army still had some 12,000 Green rifles in service. After the war all of them were converted to much better Peabody action.

After 1880. Serbian Peabody rifles were mostly replaced with 100.000 more modern bolt-action Mauser-Koka rifles imported from Germany.

Only the First class militiamen had complete, state-issued uniforms: the Second and Third class soldiers wore their own civilian clothes.

== Military equipment ==
- Francotte carbine M1849/56
- Russian musket model 1845
- Lorenz Model 1854
- Green Model 1867
- Peabody Model 1870
- Krnka
- Wanzl rifle
- Werndl-Holub rifle
- Mauser-Koka Model 1880
- Berdan rifle
- Snider-Enfield (spoils)
- Martini-Henry (spoils)
- Winchester rifle (spoils)
- Lefaucheux-Francotte M. 71
- Smith & Wesson Model 3
- Yatagan
- Bayonet
- Sabre

== Wars ==
Conflict	Combatant 1	Combatant 2	Result
Serbian–Turkish Wars (1876–1878)	Serbia	Ottoman Empire	Victory

== See also ==
- Serbian Army (revolutionary)

== Sources ==
- Ahrens, G.H. (2007). Diplomacy on the Edge: Containment of Ethnic Conflict and the Minorities Working Group of the Conferences on Yugoslavia. Woodrow Wilson Center Press Series. Johns Hopkins University Press. ISBN 978-0-8018-8557-0.
- Babac, D. (2015). The Serbian Army in the Wars for Independence Against Turkey, 1876-1878. Helion. ISBN 978-1-909982-24-6.
- Bogdanović, B.; Valenčak, I. (1990). Rifles: two centuries of rifles on the territory of Yugoslavia (in Serbian). Sportinvest. ISBN 978-86-7597-001-9.
- Gažević, N. (1974). Military Encyclopedia. Military Encyclopedia (in Serbian). Vol. 7. Belgrade: Military Publishing House.
- Gažević, N. (1967). Military Encyclopedia. Military Encyclopedia (in Serbian). Vol. 9. Belgrade: Military Publishing House.
- Lampe (2000). Yugoslavia as History: Twice There Was a Country. Cambridge University Press. ISBN 978-0-521-77401-7.
- Stokes, G. (1990). Politics as Development: The Emergence of Political Parties in Nineteenth-century Serbia. Duke University Press. ISBN 978-0-8223-1016-7.
