= National Militia (Serbia) =

Reserve force of the Serbian Army in 1861-1882

- Narodna vojska Народна војска
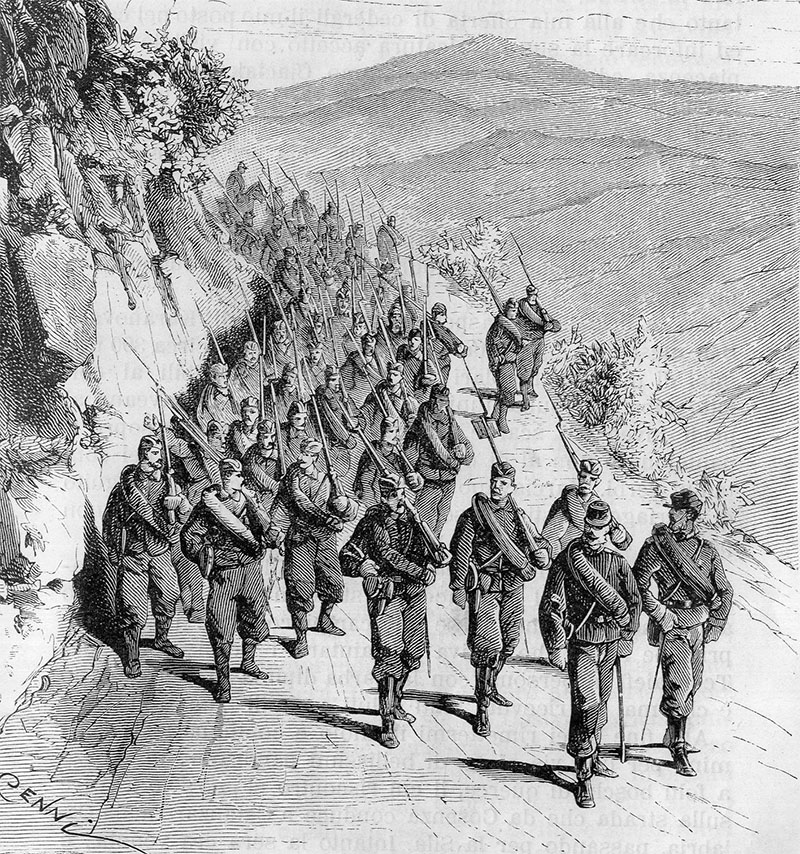
- Serbian National Militia of the First class in 1876.
- Active: 1861–1882
- Country: Principality of Serbia
- Branch: Armed Forces of the Principality of Serbia
- Type: Reserve force Militia
- Size: 90,000 (1862); 120,000 (1876)
- Engagements: Serbian–Ottoman Wars (1876–1878); Timok Rebellion (1883)

Commanders
- Notable commanders: Mihailo Obrenović (1861–1868); Milan Obrenović (1868–1882)

National Militia (Serbian: Народна војска, Narodna vojska) was the most numerous part of the Serbian Army between 1861 and 1882. It was a territorial militia composed of all able-bodied men of the Principality of Serbia aged 20 to 50, formed into territorial units, who were obliged to do military training on Sundays in their towns and villages under the command of a few professional officers. Poorly trained, ill-equipped, these militia still managed to liberate Serbia in the Serbian–Ottoman Wars (1876–1878), but were disbanded with the passing of the Standing Army Law in 1882. In 1883, some of the former National Militia units rebelled against the Government, but were defeated in the short-lived Timok Rebellion.

== Formation ==
As Principality of Serbia gained its autonomy within the Ottoman Empire as a vassal state in 1830, a small Serbian Regular Army was established in order to protect the peace within its borders. It was armed and uniformed in the European fashion, trained by the former Austrian and Russian officers: by 1860, it had no more than 3,500 professional soldiers.

In 1861. Prince Mihailo Obrenović (1860–1868), adopted a new Law on the National Militia, which included military service for men between the ages of 20 and 50 who were trained locally.

In August 1861, a law was duly passed making all able-bodied men between the ages of twenty and fifty liable for military service. Those between twenty and thirty were to train on Sundays and holidays, while the rest were reservists, obliged to train on a monthly basis. Within ten years, Serbia could field a massive force of some 90,000 men out of a population of one and a quarter million. The construction of an army at lightning speed was accompanied by tremendous patriotic fervour: songs hailing Serbia's great military traditions; articles predicting an imminent revolutionary war which would sweep the Turks out of Europe and keep the Austrians at bay; and endless slogans. ‘Educated Serbs even liked to boast of being a modern Sparta, the Piedmont of the South Slavs or, better yet, the Prussia of the Balkans’, as a historian of modern Serbia has remarked. In this respect, the militarization of Serbia, based on the peasantry, fostered a novel nationalist ideology in which the masses, and not just the bureaucratic elite, played a historic role. But it also created a dangerous illusion, as sheer numbers did not make an army. Discipline, clothing, medical support, proper logistics and, above all, an abundant supply of weapons and well-trained officers did. The new Serbian military could fulfil none of these requirements, as the country was to learn dramatically during the First Serbian-Ottoman War of 1876. By the time of his assassination in 1868, Prince Michael was almost certainly aware of these deficiencies, as he had invited foreign delegations to assess his army. Their observations were uniformly dismissive.

== Organisation ==
People's Militia was divided into the "First Class" (men under the age of 35) and the "Second Class", organized into territorial battalions (62 in number) and regiments (17, one in each county). There were also 17 squadrons of cavalry, 17 pioneer units of 60 men each, and 6 artillery batteries (1,200 men). In 1861, First Class could field about 50,000 men, the Second about 40,000. Every county had its own military department, with several regular officers and NCOs, who organized recruitment, supplies, armament and training of National Militia. Military training was done on Sundays and holidays: battalions trained for two days every other week, and regiments 15 days a year. NCOs and officers under the rank of captain were selected from the common people, mostly peasants, by the county elders, battalion and squadron commanders were selected by the Minister of War, and regiment commanders were appointed by the Prince. In 1866, new military schools were opened in Belgrade and Kragujevac, to provide Militia officers with basic training in tactics, fortification and topography.

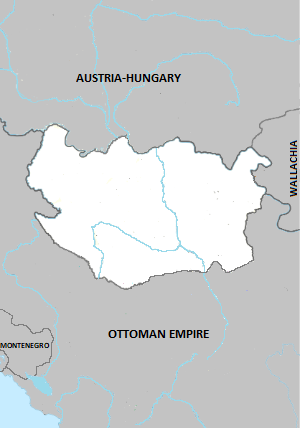
County seats of the Principality of Serbia in 1876. Each county provided two brigades (before 1870. a regiment) of infantry and a squadron of cavalry for the National Militia. Brigades wore the name of their respective counties. Smaller green dots are seats of military districts (srez) within the counties: each district was to provide two battalions of infantry and a company of cavalry.

In 1876, the National Militia was formed in brigades: each county was to equip one brigade of the First and one the Second Class (in total 18 of each class), as well as a battalion of the "Third Class" (men over the age of 50). Brigades of the First Class were organized into 6 divisions. However, battalions were the main operational units, and were used independently of their brigades and divisions. In 1876. there were 80 battalions of the First Class, 80 battalions of the Second Class and 18 battalions of the Third Class.

== Equipment ==
=== Firearms ===
Military service was without pay, and militiamen were expected to provide their own weapons and clothing. In 1862, the Serbian People's Militia existed on paper only: less than a half of the militiamen had serviceable rifles, mostly old Austrian and Ottoman flintlock muskets.

Since 1856, Serbia had its own weapons factory in Kragujevac, which produced light bronze cannon and copper percussion caps, and by 1862 have converted some 15,000 old flintlock muskets into percussion rifles. In 1863. Serbia received some 31.000 (or 39.200) old percussion muskets from Russia (Russian musket model 1845): these muskets were converted to rifles in Kragujevac and became the standard weapon of the National Militia, known in Serbia simply as the Russian rifles.

In 1867, the first Serbian breechloading rifles (Green model 1867) were made in Belgrade Arsenal, by converting some 27,000 cheaply bought Austrian decommissioned Lorenz rifles. In 1870, the Serbian army adopted new, much better breechloading rifle (Peabody model 1870), converting some 28.000 imported Belgian percussion rifles.

=== Uniforms ===
In 1876, units of the First Class were given state-issued uniforms (hats, coats, trousers and greatcoats) and were armed with breechloading rifles (mostly newer Peabody model 1870). Units of the Second Class were supposed to be at least partially uniformed (hats and greatcoats), but in practice mostly wore their own civilian clothes: few were armed with older Green model 1867 breechloading rifles, but most had only Russian and Belgian percussion muzzleloaders.

== Battle performance ==
Serbian National Militia was put to test for the first time in Serbian-Ottoman Wars (1876-1878) with mostly disappointing results. Carl von Mayers, a German officer who spent the First Serbian-Ottoman War in the Ottoman headquarters in Niš on the main theatre of war (as a military correspondent), gave a detailed analysis of the Serbian militia's battle performance: he said the infantry was bad, the cavalry non-existent, and the artillery, on the contrary, very good:

The Serbian infantry must definitely be called bad. Neither trained nor disciplined, even with the most skilful leadership and the greatest enthusiasm for the cause for which it fought, it cannot at all meet the requirements of modern warfare, which sets as the main requirement precisely what the Serbian army lacked. This fact was visibly evident in every battle, whether offensive or defensive, and expressed itself above all in the opening of fire at unattainable distances, in the relatively extremely small number of hits and in the failure to hold out under fire. The comparatively small loss figures of the Turks in most skirmishes and the fact that there was not even a single hand-to-hand fight during the war show, on the one hand, the extremely insufficient training of the Serbian soldiers for firefights, but on the other hand the lack of that moral support which is required for carrying out of the bayonet attack . How little the principles of discipline have taken root in the ranks of the Serbian troops is amply demonstrated by the fact that after every retreat of the Serbs the battlefield was covered with guns, overcoats, etc. which were thrown away by fleeing soldiers.

No matter how much the lack of training and discipline must be described as a fundamental evil of the Serbian infantry, just as little one cannot fail to recognize the appropriate leadership of smaller troop detachments. This was to be observed during the opening of every battle, up to the moment when, through the more intense combat, the officer's direct influence on the individual began to wane; then, however, the already loose fire discipline died out, disorder followed, and finally a disorderly retreat.

We are unable to pass judgment on the Serbian cavalry, since they were neither used in combat during the war nor used in the exercise of the scouting service; However, this circumstance does not speak for the action power of this branch.

The Serbian artillery, mostly commanded by Russian officers, proved very good and was the only military arm which commanded the respect of the Turkish officers.
