= 12 mm Lefaucheux =

Black powder revolver cartridge

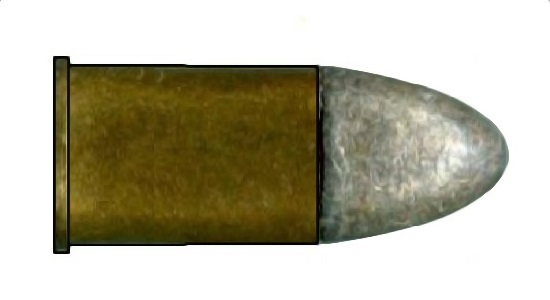
- Type: Revolver

Service history
- In service: 1858–1892
- Used by: French Navy and French Army

Production history
- Designed: 1858

Specifications
- Case type: Rimmed, straight
- Bullet diameter: 11.3 mm (0.44 in)
- Neck diameter: 11.8 mm (0.46 in)
- Base diameter: 11.9 mm (0.47 in)
- Rim diameter: 12.6 mm (0.50 in)
- Rim thickness: 0.94 mm
- Case length: 19.9 mm (0.78 in)
- Overall length: 30.8 mm (1.21 in)

The 12mm Lefaucheux is a metallic center-fire cartridge. It was originally created as a rimless pinfire cartridge using black powder employed by the French navy on the Lefaucheux M1858 revolver. Later it was adapted to a center-fire cartridge by the French Army in 1873 for use on the MAS 1873 revolver.

== Overview ==
Originally, the 12 mm, was a classic Lefaucheux cartridge, with a side pin from its introduction in 1858 until 1873, when it was adapted and became a rimmed center-fire cartridge for use in the MAS revolver 1873-1874 then used by the French Army.

== Features ==
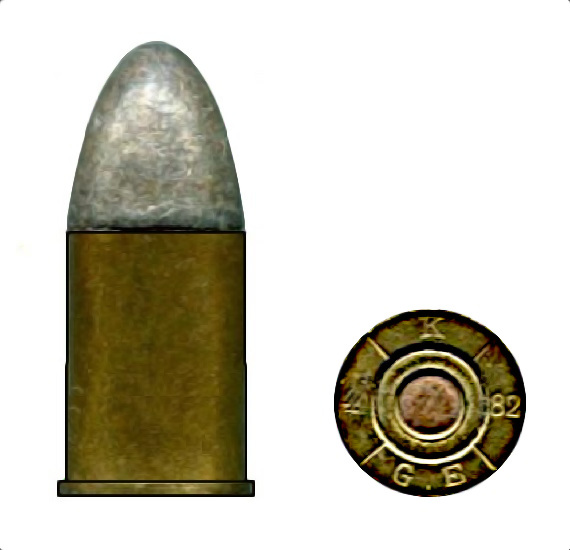
The 12mm Lefaucheux.

These are the characteristics of the '12 mm Lefaucheux' cartridge:

- Brass case
- Caliber: 12mm
- Ammo: 12 X 17
- Bullet diameter: 11.30 - 11.40 mm (.444" - .448")
- Neck diameter: 11.80 - 11.85 mm (.464" - .466)
- Base diameter: 11.90 - 11.92 mm (.468" - .469")
- Rim diameter: 12.64 - 12.66 mm (.497" - .498")
- Rim thickness: 0.9 - 1.0 mm (.035" - .039")
- Case length: 19.90 - 20.00 mm (.783" - .787")
- Overall length: 30.77 - 30.80 mm (1.211" - 1.212")
- Primer: patented GAUPILLAT
- Total weight: 18.34 grams
- Bullet weight (lead): 12.80 grams
- Cartridge weight: 4.74 grams
- Black powder charge: 0.80 g

These are the most frequently encountered ("headstamp") tags:

- 1 / E / 82 / G. E
- 4 / F / 82 / G.E
- 1 / G / 82 / G. E
- 4 / G / 82 / G.E
- 4 / M / 82 / G. E
- 4 / K / 82 / G. E

In these markings, the initials "G. E" referring to the manufacturer "Ernest Gaupillat", and the other letter and digits referring to the batch (probably place and date).

== Dimensions ==
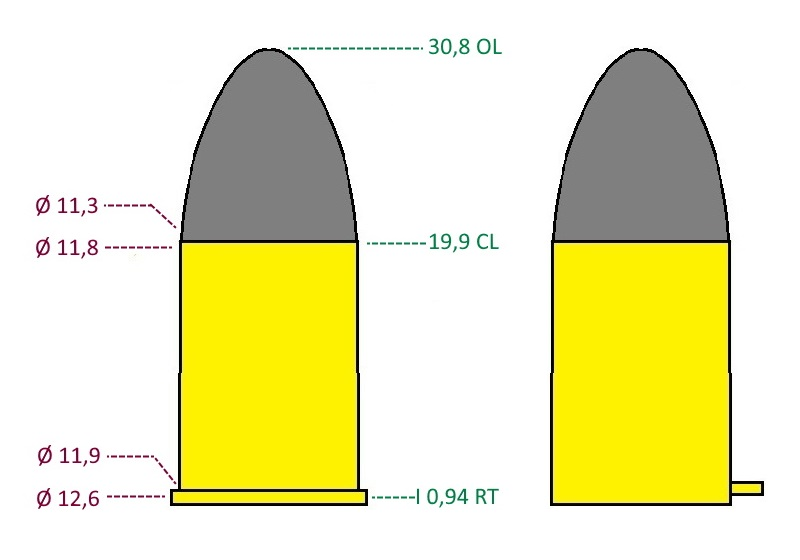

== See also ==
- 12 mm caliber
- List of handgun cartridges
