= 11mm French Ordnance =

Rimmed black powder revolver cartridge

11mm French Ordnance (11.46×17mmR)
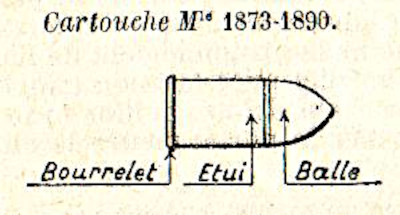
- Type: Revolver

Service history
- In service: 1873–1892
- Used by: French Army

Specifications
- Case type: Rimmed, straight
- Bullet diameter: 11.46 mm (0.451 in)
- Base diameter: 11.45 mm (0.451 in)
- Rim diameter: 12.5 mm (0.49 in)
- Rim thickness: 1.4 mm
- Case length: 17 mm (0.67 in)
- Overall length: 30 mm (1.2 in)

Ballistic performance
Bullet mass/type	Velocity	Energy
11.7 g (181 gr); Model 1873; 0.65 g powder charge	130 m/s (430 ft/s)	98.1 J (72.4 ft⋅lbf)
10.6 g (164 gr); Model 1873/90; 0.80 g powder charge	190 m/s (620 ft/s)	196.2 J (144.7 ft⋅lbf)
0.4 g (6 gr) paper dummy bullet Model 1890/1900 blank 1.10 g powder charge	0 m/s (0 ft/s)	0 J (0 ft⋅lbf)
- Test barrel length: 114 mm

The 11mm French Ordnance (11.46×17mmR) is a rimmed black powder cartridge intended for the 11 mm MAS 1873-1874 revolver in service with the French Army. The velocity and power of the first variant, equivalent to the .25 ACP at just 74 ft/lbs of energy, was weak even for its time. The second variant, 1873–1890, corresponded in power to the .32 ACP with 140 ft/lbs of energy.

== See also ==
List of handgun cartridges
