= Lefaucheux M1858 =

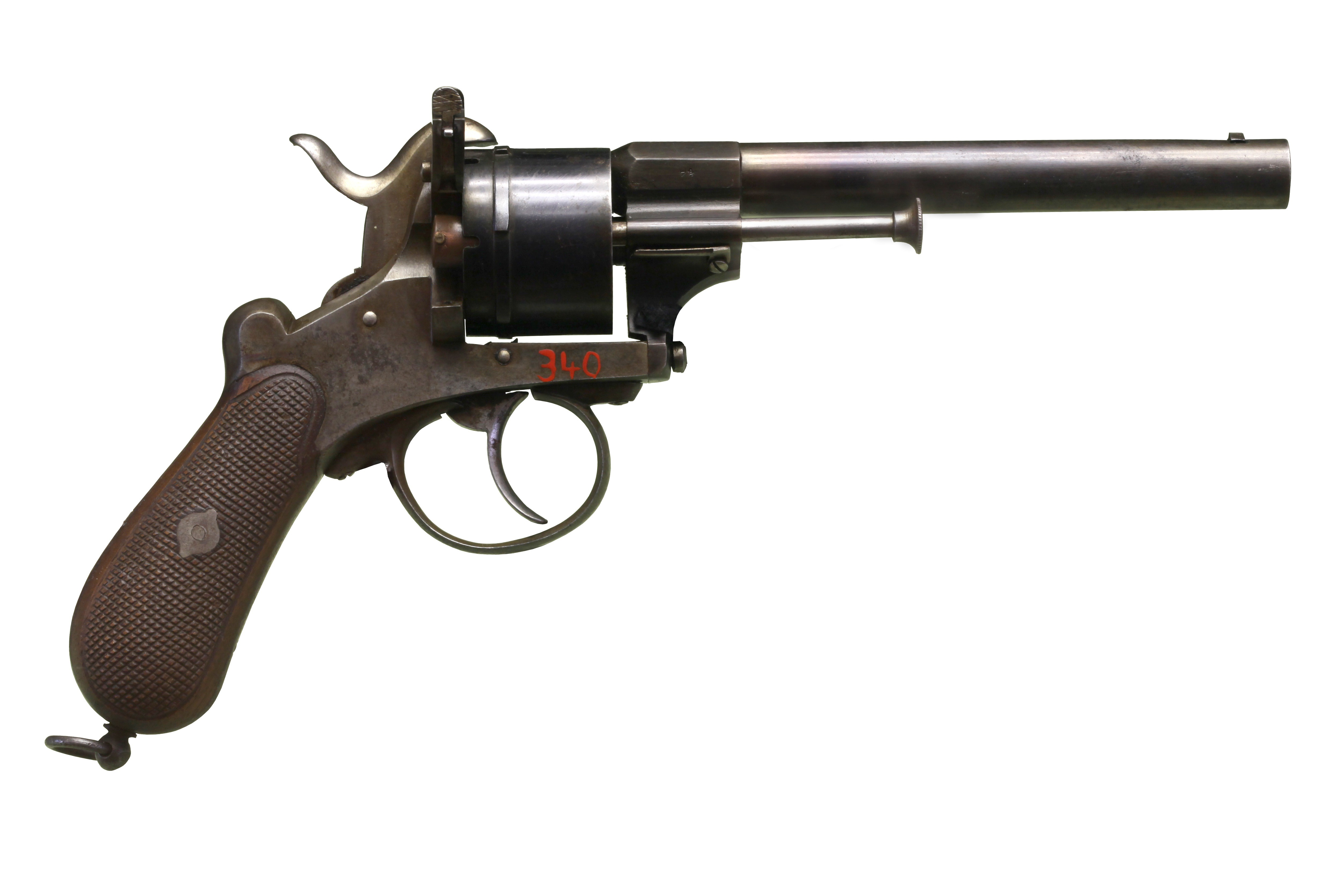
- A Belgian copy produced c. 1860–1865 on display at the Morges military museum, Switzerland
- Type: Revolver
- Place of origin: France

Service history
- In service: 1858–1873
- Used by: See § Users
- Wars: French intervention in Mexico; Italian Wars of Unification; American Civil War; Paraguayan War; Franco-Prussian War; Second Schleswig War; First Sino-Japanese War

Production history
- Designer: Casimir and Eugene Lefaucheux
- Designed: 1854
- Manufacturer: La Societété Lefaucheux et Cie; Manufacture d'armes de Saint-Étienne; A. Francotte; J. B. Ronge Fils
- Unit cost: $13.54 ($485.20 in 2025)
- Produced: 1858–1865
- Variants: See § Variants

Specifications (M1858)
- Mass: 1.06–1.10 kg (37.5–38.8 oz)
- Length: 290 mm (11.6 in)
- Barrel length: 160 mm (6.2 in)
- Cartridge: 7 mm Lefaucheux; 9 mm Lefaucheux; 11 mm Lefaucheux; 12 mm Lefaucheux
- Caliber: 7–12 mm (0.28–0.47 in)
- Action: Single-action
- Muzzle velocity: 160 m/s (540 ft/s)
- Feed system: 6-round cylinder

The Lefaucheux M1858 was a French military revolver developed for the navy, chambered for the 12 mm pinfire cartridge, and based on a design by Casimir Lefaucheux and his son, Eugene (also a gun designer), it holds the distinction of being the first revolver using metallic cartridges to be adopted by any armed service. The basic Lefaucheux design was adopted by several European countries, copied and improved over the years before being replaced by centerfire revolvers in the late 19th century.

== Design ==
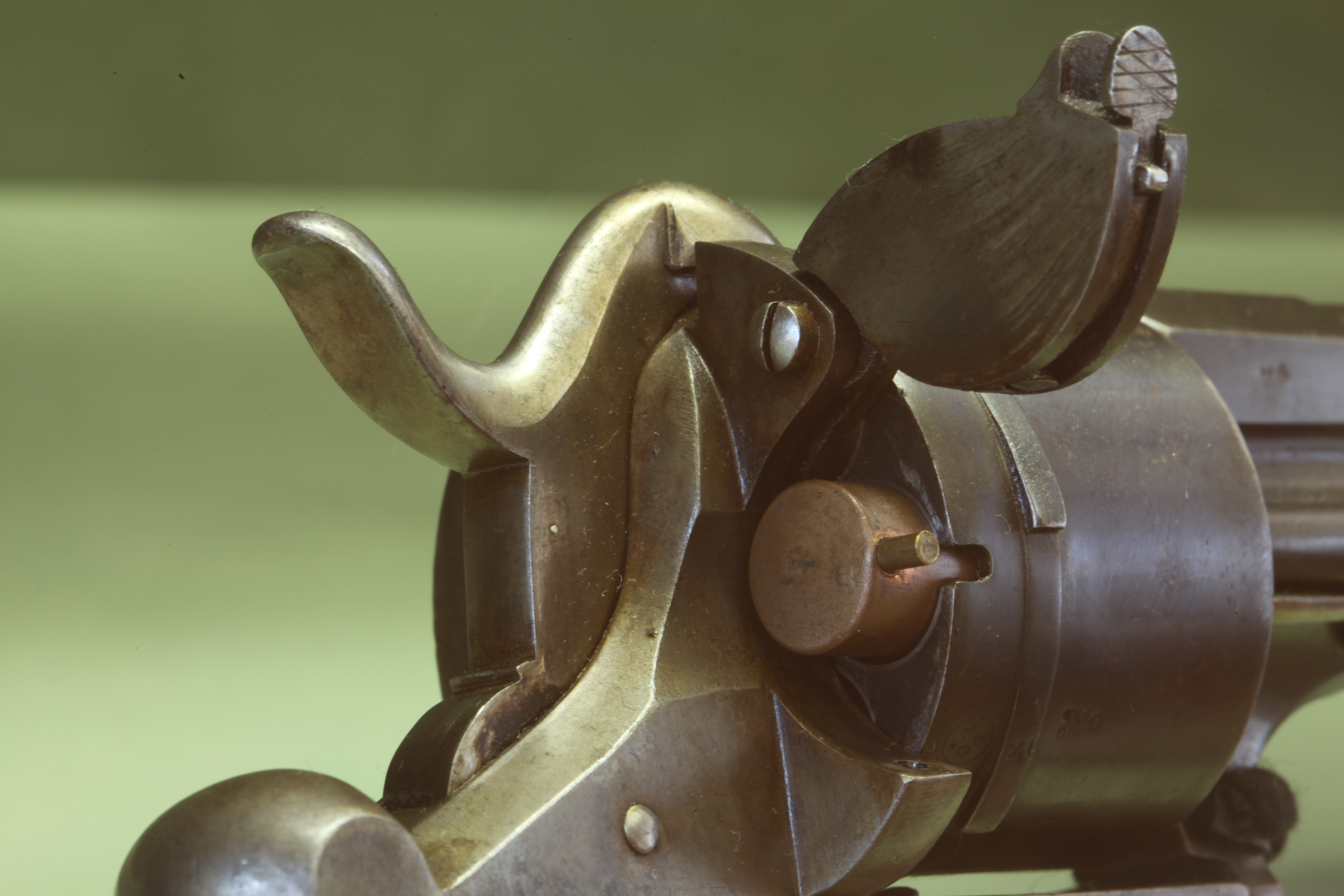
View of the opened hinged gate, with a pinfire cartridge partially ejected.

The Lefaucheux is a six-shot open framed design, loaded via a hinged gate on the right side of the frame, through which empty cartridges are also ejected via an ejector rod running along the barrel. The cylinder is notched to accommodate the pinfire cartridges exposed pin which sets off the primer charge when struck by the hammer. A protective shroud was added to the recoil shield to prevent accidental discharges. The revolver originally used a single-action trigger, but by 1865, double-action versions were also introduced.

=== Ammunition ===
Most service handguns were chambered for a 11 mm cartridge, while the numerous copies made by Belgian and French gunmakers were chambered in calibers ranging from 7 mm to 12 mm. According to Walter, revolvers imported by the United States during the Civil War fired a 12 mm cartridge loaded with 9.7 grains (0.63 g) of black powder and a 208 gr (13.5 g) bullet at 160 m/s (540 ft/s).

While the pinfire cartridge is prone to accidental discharge if handled carelessly, it did have the advantage of being more resistant to moisture than the loose powder used by percussion cap revolvers, while the copper or brass case also provides a gas seal and is reloadable.

In 1870, the French converted their revolvers to fire 11 mm centerfire cartridges loaded with 12.3 gr (0.80 g) of black powder and a 128 gr (8.3 g) bullet at 215 m/s (710 ft/s), similar to the ammunition used on the MAS 1873 revolver, but slightly longer.

== History and adoption ==
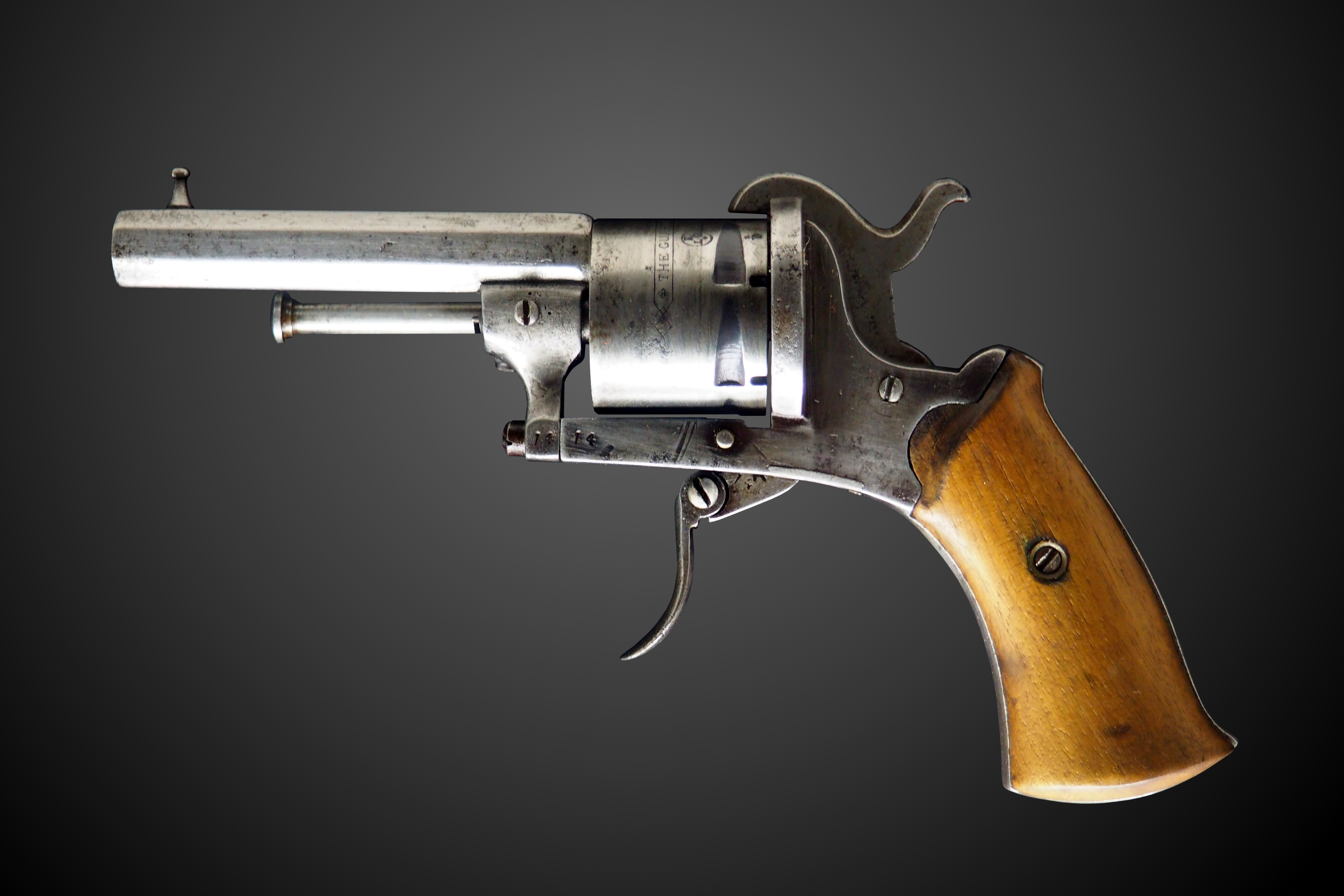
A 7 mm Guardian American Model 1878, a Belgian-made Lefaucheux copy

Casimir Lefaucheux made the first practical handgun—a pepper-box—designed to use metallic cartridges. His son, Eugene filed a patent for a percussion cap revolver adapted to load and fire pinfire ammunition on 15 April 1854 (predating Rollin White's by a year). Commonly known as the Lefaucheux, La Societété Lefaucheux et Cie only made a few of them, while most were copies made by numerous Belgian and French gunmakers, including Manufacture d'armes de Saint-Étienne for the French Navy.

After three years of testing, the French Navy adopted the 10.7 mm Lefaucheux in 1858 due to the need of a reliable design capable of withstanding the damp conditions encountered at the sea for boarding parties. The Model 1858 became the first metallic cartridge revolver to be officially adopted by any armed service, with Sweden and Spain accepting it for service in 1863, followed by Norway in 1864.

The French Army, viewing revolvers as personal defense weapons unsuitable for offensive combat, did not issue service revolvers until 1873, when they adopted a Chamelot-Delvigne design as the MAS 1873 revolver instead, though some cavalrymen demanded and received some Lefaucheuxs before being deployed in 1862 during the second French intervention in Mexico.

In 1870, the French Navy adopted a double-action, centerfire version of the Lefaucheux, starting a trend with armed forces all over the world adopting centerfire revolvers. The M1870 Lefaucheux remained in service until it was replaced by a slightly modified MAS 1873.

The Lefaucheux was one of the few foreign-manufactured handguns to have been imported by the United States government during the American Civil War and the only non-percussion cap revolver used either side during the conflict. Over 12,000 were ordered by Federal authorities for cavalry use, with most of these serving in the Western Theater. During the 1861–1862 purchases, each gun cost about $13.54 each ($485.20 in 2025) and nearly 850,000 cartridges were purchased on average 49 cents ($17.56 in 2025) per hundred. These guns were replaced as soon as Colt or Remington cap and ball revolvers were available: an inventory conducted in the spring of 1864 revealed that only 125 were still in service with the Union Army.

Some were also purchased by the Confederates. These guns were mostly carried by officers including General Stonewall Jackson, who was presented with an elaborately engraved Lefaucheux by his troops. With the end of the conflict, most were sold as military surplus with none remaining in use with the US Army, though a few were carried by settlers to the West.

== Variants ==
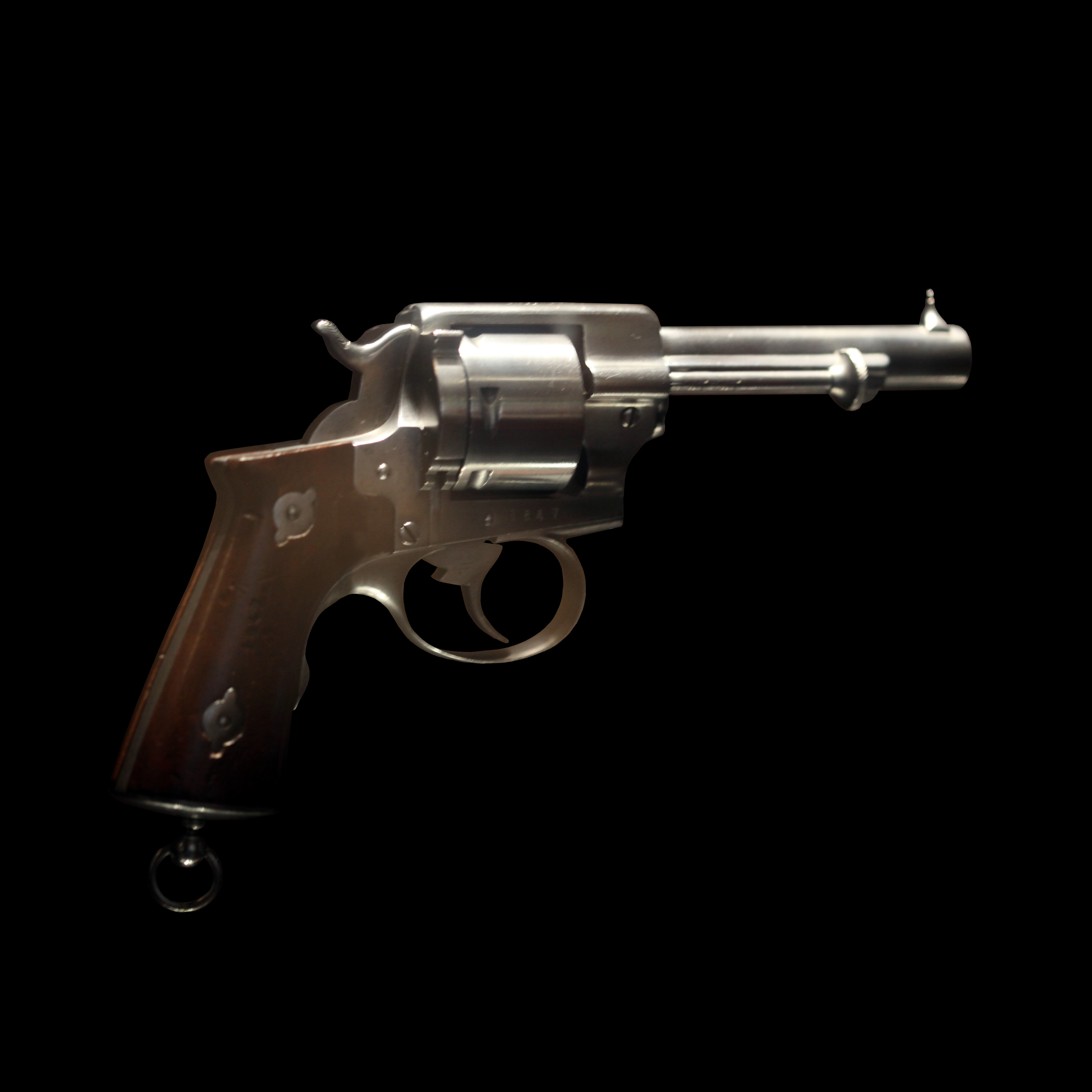
A French Navy Lefaucheux M1870

=== France ===
- Lefaucheux Model 1854 − Eugene Lefaucheux original patent
- Lefaucheux Model 1858 − A single-action 10.7 mm pinfire revolver adopted by the French Navy, officially designated as Lefaucheux Modèle 1858
- Lefaucheux Model 1870 − A double-action, 11 mm centerfire conversion of the Model 1858. Popularly known as the Model 1858 Navy Revolver Transformed, its official designation was Revolver Modèle 1870, Modifie N

=== Other countries ===
- Gasser Model 1870 − A 11.43 mm revolver designed by Leopold Gasser using the Lefaucheux double-action lock mechanism. Adopted by the Austro-Hungarian Army
- Gasser-Kropatschek Officer Model − A 9 mm revolver, it was a downscaled M1870 designed by Alfred von Kropatschek and Johann Gasser, Leopold's younger brother. It was issued to infantry officers and gendarmerie under the official designation Gasser-Kropatschek Infanterieoffizersrevolver
- Lefaucheux Private Model 1864 − A single-action pinfire revolver, issued to artillery and cavalry privates of the Norwegian Army. 1,100 were ordered from Lefaucheux in 1864 with an additional 200 made by Kongsberg Våpenfabrikk in 1867

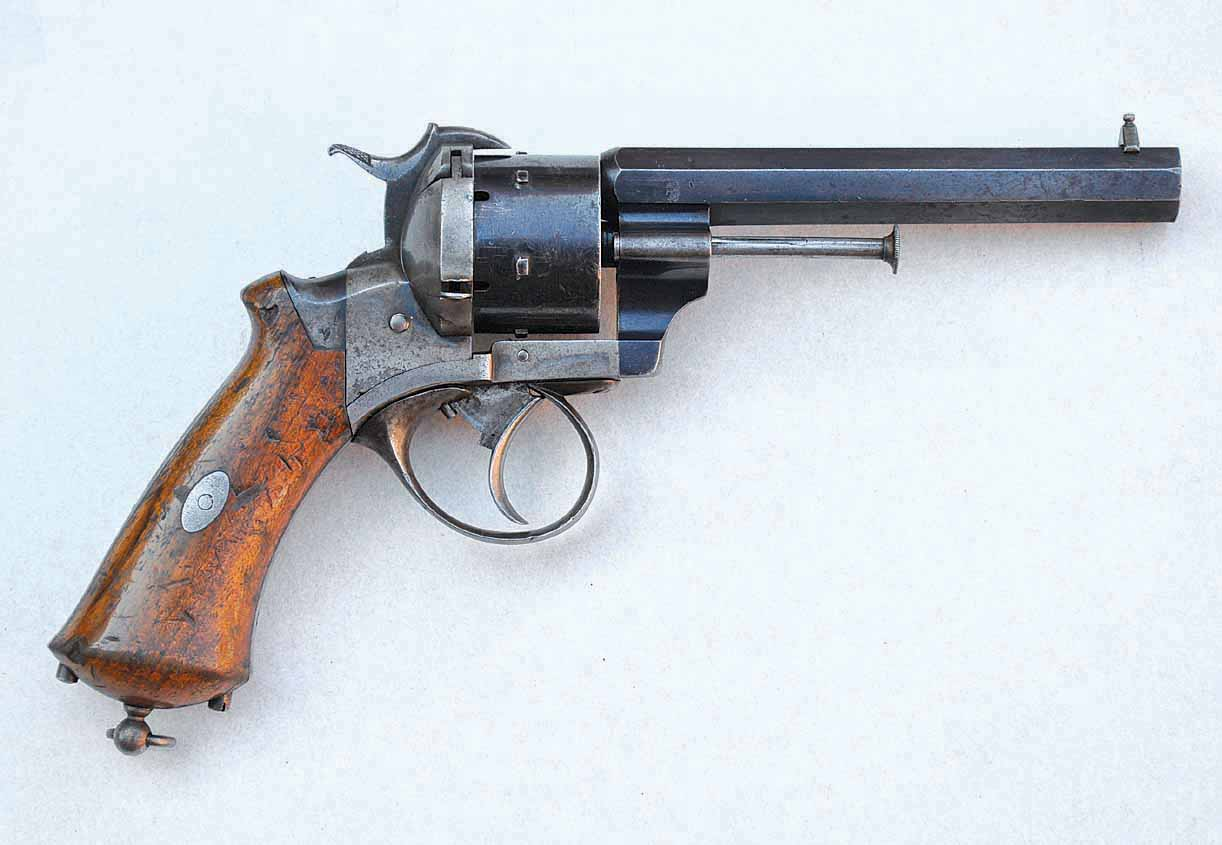
A double-action Officer M1864 with octagonal barrel

- Lefaucheux Officer Model 1864 − A single (enkeltspenner) or double-action (selvspenner) pinfire revolver made for Norwegian Army officers, who could choose which type of action they wanted. Most guns have an octagonal barrel instead of the round barrels used on the private models. 200 single-actions and 200 double-actions were ordered from Lefaucheux
- Lefaucheux M/1864/1898 − A modification of the Model 1864 to fire centerfire cartridges, a reinforcing bar was screwed on the top of the frame, similar to the Danish Model 1865/97 revolver
- Lefaucheux-Francotte Model 1865 − An 11 mm pinfire revolver with a solid frame and a rod ejector adopted by the Danish military
- Lefaucheux-Francotte Model 1865/97 − A conversion on the Model 1865 made by Kronberg Gevaerfabrik to fire 11.45 mm centerfire cartridges
- Lefaucheux-Francotte Model 1871 − A double-action, 11 mm centerfire revolver adopted by the Swedish military. Most were produced by Auguste Francotte of Liège but a substantial number were also made at Husqvarna Vapenfabrik

== Users ==
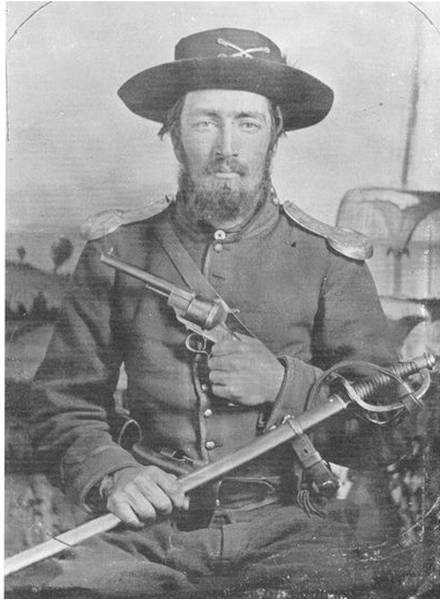
A Union soldier with a sabre and a Lefaucheux revolver.

- Austria-Hungary − Gasser M1870 and M1876
- Empire of Brazil − Issued to cavalry units
- Confederate States of America − Limited use by officers
- Denmark − Used by sub-officers and buglers from cavalry and field artillery units; also used by cavalry pioneers
- France − Models 1858 and 1870 used by the French Navy, the latter remained in use as late as 1893
- Kingdom of Italy − Issued to artillery and engineering units, also used by the Carabinieri
- Norway − Used by artillery and cavalry officers, sub-officers, and buglers
- Peru
- Kingdom of Portugal
- Qing dynasty
- Spain − Issued to military officers
- Sweden
- United States − Used during the American Civil War

== Archaeology ==
A western style pistol along with bullets and other related items were recovered in the Japanese artificial island of Dejima, a Dutch United East Indies Company settlement in Japan. They were found outside the wall of the Kapitan's (Captain's) quarters. The Kapitan is the Director of Dejima Factory.

"The pistol is 31 cm in overall length with a caliber of 1.3 cm, a revolver of the type invented in the mid 19th century by the Frenchman Lefaucheux."

A Lefaucheux revolver thought to be the one with which the artist Vincent Van Gogh shot himself in the chest, resulting in his death two days later, was found proximate to the site of the self-shooting in a wheatfield near Paris more than 70 years later.
