= MAS 1873 revolver =

French modèle 1873 revolver
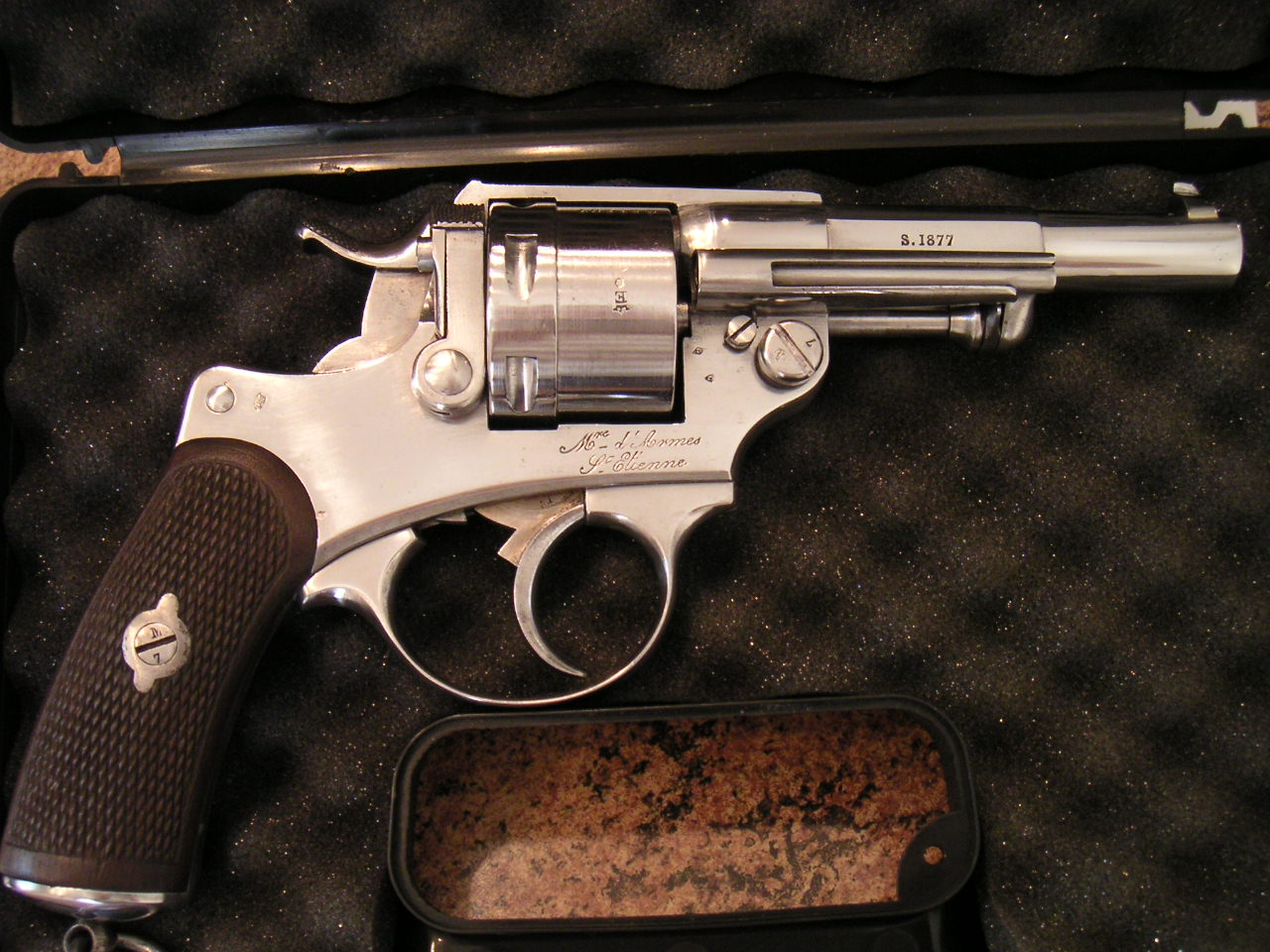
- Model 1873
- Type: Service Revolver
- Place of origin: French Third Republic

Service history
- In service: 1873–1945
- Used by: See Users
- Wars: French Colonial conflicts, Monegasque Revolution, Balkan Wars; First World War, Second World War

Production history
- Designer: Henri-Gustave Delvigne; J. Chamelot
- Manufacturer: Manufacture d'armes de Saint-Étienne
- Produced: 1873–1887
- No. built: 337,000
- Variants: MAS 1874

Specifications
- Mass: 1.04 kg
- Length: 240 mm
- Barrel length: 115 mm
- Cartridge: 11 mm Mle 1873, 12 mm Lefaucheux (Navy models)
- Caliber: 11 mm
- Action: Double Action revolver
- Rate of fire: 20–30 rounds/minute
- Effective firing range: 50 metres
- Maximum firing range: 300 metres
- Feed system: 6-round cylinder
- Sights: Fixed front blade and rear notch

The service revolver model 1873 Chamelot-Delvigne was the first double-action revolver used by the French Army. It was produced by Manufacture d'armes de Saint-Étienne from 1873 to 1887 in about 337,000 copies. Although replaced by the Modele 1892 revolver, it was nevertheless widely used during the First World War and issued to reserve units in 1940. The French Resistance made widespread use of it during the German occupation.

The model 1874, of which 35,000 were made, was an officer's version. It differs from the model 1873 by having a lighter structure and a darker finish. Many copies for civilian sale were made in France and Belgium.

Both the 1873 and the 1874 use an 11mm cartridge which proved to have insufficient velocity. The weapons themselves were very reliable and resistant to damage.

A Navy version was also produced. A more powerful cartridge was produced for this version, but production ceased and they turned to the regular ammunition when the stocks were depleted.

== Overview ==
The Franco-Prussian War in 1870 clearly demonstrated the need for up-to-date equipment in war time. A great military tradition and esprit de corps can be defeated by superior training, and in the case of that war, artillery. After the war, both Germany and France continued to improve their military technology. However, neither side was convinced of the importance of pistols for field officers. The sword continued to be the symbol of authority for an officer on the battlefield all the way into World War I. European general staffs at that time were extremely conservative and pistols were sometimes grudgingly adopted as personal defense weapons with no practical offensive use. Even as pistols became more of a symbol of the officer, most preferred to privately purchase a smaller and more comfortable handgun instead of using a large standard issue revolver.

The Chamelot-Delvigne 11mm Modele 1873 was adopted by the French Army as a service revolver for non-commissioned officers. The Modele 1874 Revolver d'Officier was the version issued to officers. The differences between the two models included the following: the 1873 was finished in the white, whereas the 1874 had a fluted cylinder and a blued finish. The 1873 and 1874 were the first center-fire cartridge revolvers adopted by the army. They had solid-frame, side-ejection, double-action mechanisms. The French Navy, after concluding that their Lefaucheux revolvers were too low-powered for combat and prone to accidental ignition, also adopted the Chamelot-Delvigne as replacement in 1873.

These revolvers were manufactured by the St. Etienne arsenal, which still continues to manufacture fine sporting arms.

The design of the Chamelot-Delvigne revolvers became so popular that versions were adopted by the Belgian in 1871, Italian, and 1872 in Switzerland with the Model 1872 Revolver.

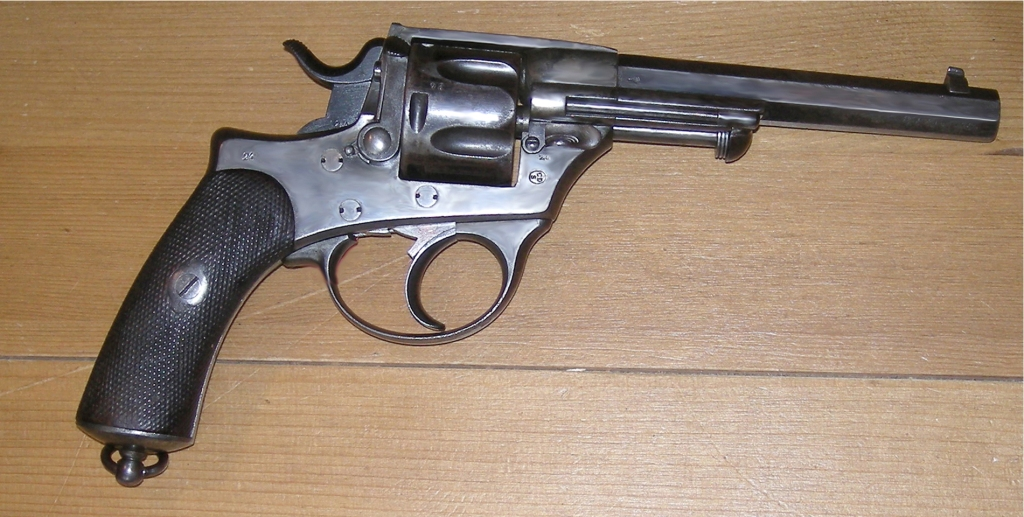
Revolver Model 1872

The caliber of these French pistols was 11x17.8mmR. The French round was actually 0.47 mm larger than its German counterpart. The German round could be loaded and used in the French pistol, but French rounds would not chamber in the German pistol. The cartridge had a pointed lead bullet weighing 11 grams. The case length was 17.8 mm, which was rather on the short side. Reloading this cartridge could take some patience due to the shortness of the case. Military specifications called for black powder loads, replaced by a mild smokeless powder in the early twentieth century. Standard muzzle velocity was around 550 feet per second.

The cylinder had a side-loading gate which pulled straight to the rear. The sight picture was a ball and v type and is easy to align. It could be difficult to stay on target when shooting double-action due to the stiffness of the action. There was certainly no danger of accidentally pulling the trigger double-action. Cleaning and disassembly were easy as the cylinder pin doubled as a screwdriver and all-purpose tool. Internal parts were finely machined and finished. The trigger, hammer, and several of the internal springs were straw-finished, a type of case-hardening hot oil finish.

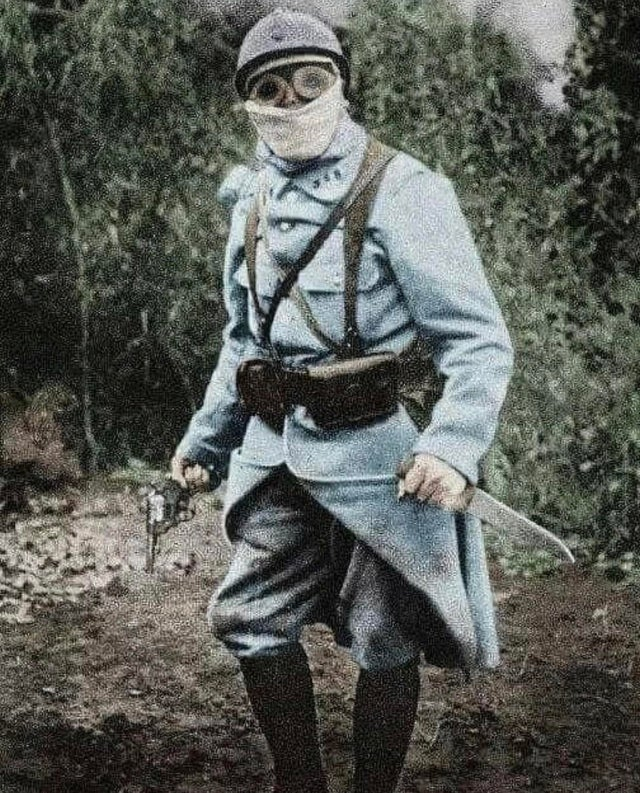
A French soldier ("trench cleaner") with a Chamelot-Delvigne revolver, a primitive gas mask (in this case a cloth mask and goggles soaked with chemicals) and a dagger (1915, colorized)

The French pistols began their service with the French army in the late 19th century and saw service all over the globe in French colonies. Many saw service in World War I when European armies finally realized how important pistols were in the trenches. The Chamelot-Delvigne finally ended its venerable service as a police sidearm in World War II.

== Features ==
=== Army model 73 ===
- Length: 240 mm
- Barrel length: 115 mm
- Weight (empty): 1.04 kg
- Cylinder: 6 cartridges
- Ammunition: 11 mm Mle 1873 (11x17mmR)
- Rifling: 4 right-hand grooves
- Operation: DA/SA

=== Army model 74 ===
- Length: 240mm
- Barrel length: 110mm
- Weight (empty): 1.08 kg
- Cylinder: 6 cartridges
- Ammunition: 11 mm MLE 1873 (11x17mmR)
- Rifling: 4 right-hand grooves
- Operation: DA/SA
- Muzzle Velocity: 600 ft/sec

== Usage ==
Model 1873 was issued to the French Army, the French Navy, the National Gendarmerie, and the French National Police until 1962. It was also in use with Banque de France, the French Forces of the Interior, and the National Forests Office. The MAS 1873 served from the early days of the French Third Republic, and the conquest of its empire, up to the Great War and the Second World War.

=== Military Users ===
- Belgium
- France
  - French Army
  - French Navy
  - French Forces of the Interior
- Greece
- Italy
- Monaco
  - Compagnie des Carabiniers du Prince
  - Corps des Sapeurs-Pompiers de Monaco
