= Francotte rifle model 1849/56 =

Francotte-Minié rifle model 1849/56
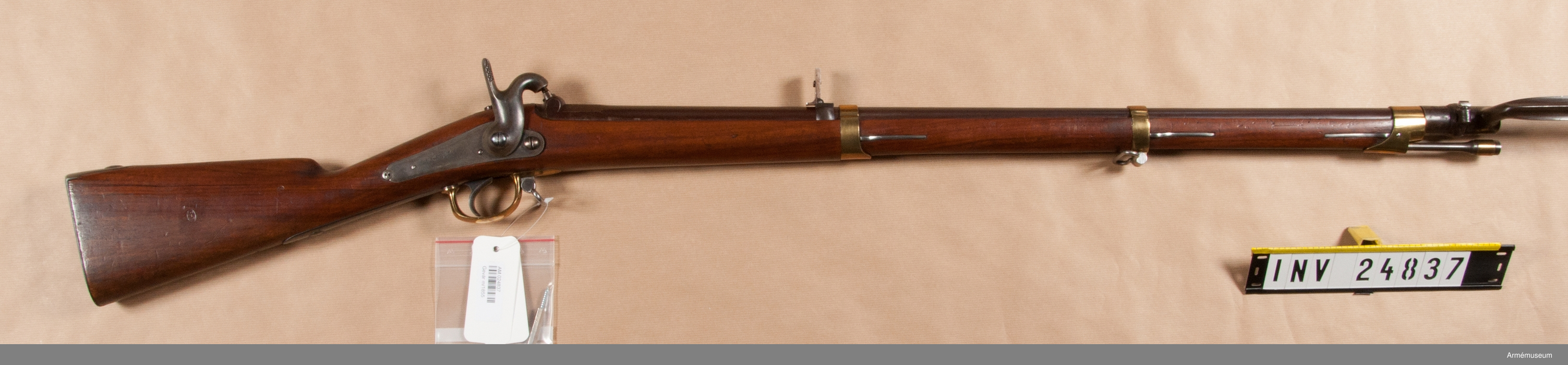
- Belgian percussion rifle model 1855, Military Museum in Stockholm.
- Type: percussion rifle
- Place of origin: Belgium

Service history
- In service: 1856–1880
- Used by: Principality of Serbia
- Wars: Serbian–Ottoman Wars (1876–1878); Timok rebellion

Production history
- Designed: 1856
- Manufacturer: Auguste Francotte&Comp., Liege, Belgium
- Produced: 1856-1858
- No. built: 7.000

Specifications
- Length: 1.285 m
- Barrel length: 868 mm
- Caliber: 17.8 mm
- Rate of fire: 2-3 rounds/min
- Feed system: Muzzle-loading

Minié-Petrović-Francotte rifle model 1849/56 (Serbian: Белгијски штуц, Belgijski štuc), percussion rifle made in Liege for the Serbian army in 1856–1858.

== History ==
=== Serbian army 1830-1856 ===
Principality of Serbia gained its autonomy from the Ottoman Empire after the Second Serbian Uprising (1815), and officially became an Ottoman client state under the Russian protectorate in 1830. The first Serbian regular military units were formed by Prince Miloš Obrenović in 1825, formally as a police force called Enlisted Watchmen (Serbian: Уписни пандури, Upisni panduri), in order not to offend the Ottoman authorities. At first, there were 12 companies (1,147 men) of these mercenaries (Serbian: Солдати, Soldati). In 1830. Serbia was officially permitted by the Ottomans to form an army, and by 1838. Serbia had 2,417 professional (regular) soldiers, armed and uniformed in the European fashion, trained by the former Austrian and Russian officers. Regular army was temporarily disbanded by the new Serbian Government in 1839 (after the exile of Prince Miloš), but was reformed in 1845. under the name of Garrison Soldiers (Serbian: Гарнизоно воинство, Garnizono voinstvo): there were 2 battalions of infantry (8 companies, 2,010 men), one artillery unit (250 men) and one squadron of cavalry (208 men), with the officers about 2,529 men.

As the Regular Army was too small to protect the country from its powerful neighbours (Austria and Ottoman Empire), during the crisis of Hungarian Revolution of 1848, when Serbia was directly threatened by the Austrian invasion, Serbian government resorted to enlistment of all the men available for the military service, the so-called People's Militia (Serbian: Народна војска, Narodna Vojska). At the time Serbia was (on paper) able to rise 94,000 men (16,000 horsemen), with 40,000 more in reserve, but there was not enough arms nor food for so many. Conscripts were expected to provide their own weapons and clothing, receiving only food and ammunition from the government. In reality, not even half of them had working rifles, mostly old flintlock muskets of the Ottoman and Austrian production.

In order to modernize Serbian army, in 1848. Serbian Government built the first Cannon Foundry (Serbian: Тополивница, Topolivnica) and State Arsenal in Belgrade, with the main production facilities in Kragujevac. In 1850. government founded Artillery School in Belgrade, which was the foundation of the Serbian Military Academy. After the Russian defeat in Crimean War (1853-1856), Serbia was made a joint protectorate of Russia, Austria, France and United Kingdom by the treaty of Paris (1856).

=== Serbian rearmament ===
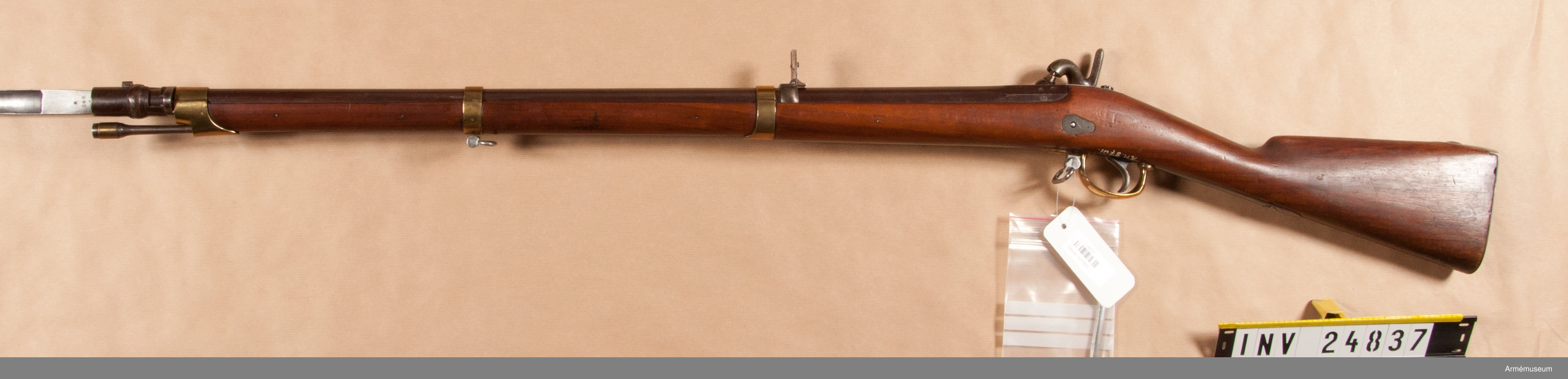
Belgian percussion rifle M1855.

In 1855. the Cannon Foundry in Kragujevac opened a rifle-production department, working on adaptation of old flintlock muskets to percussion system, with the capacity of 60 muskets a day. The same year two machines for making Minnie balls were imported from Belgium, and in 1857. Kragujevac Foundry installed the machines for production of copper percussion caps, making Serbia finally independent in the production of percussion rifle ammunition. In 1858. a new production line with 28 skilled workers under the guidance of Mihailo Cvejić was set up for converting some 15.000 old flintlock muskets to percussion system: in the first year only some 1,800 rifles were converted, then the production increased to 1.000 adapted rifles a month, so by 1863. Serbian army had some 15.000 converted percussion muskets.

Improved international relations of Serbia after Crimean War and pro-Austrian policy of Prince Aleksandar Karađorđević enabled Serbia to import some modern percussion rifle from Europe through Austria, who gave its permission in 1856. So, the Military Department of the Ministry of Internal Affairs, headed by artillery colonel Milivoje Petrović-Blaznavac, immediately ordered some modern (for the time) Minie rifles from the Belgian arms manufacturer Auguste Francotte & Co in Liege. The existing Francotte carbine of the Minie system, designed in 1849, was adapted according to Serbian (Milivoje Petrović's) specifications and put in production in 1856, so the new rifles were, somewhat confusingly, known as Minié-Petrović-Francotte rifle model 1849/56. In Serbia, they were officially called Vincennes rifles (Serbian: Венсенске пушке, Vensenske puške), or simply Belgian carbines (Serbian: Белгијски Штуц, Belgijski štuc). From 1856. to 1858, about 7.000 of these carbines arrived in Serbia through Austrian territory: in 1858, the fall of pro-Austrian government of Prince Aleksandar Karađorđević caused the Austrian government to immediately prohibit any further transport of weapons for Serbia, forcing the Serbian Government of Miloš Obrenović to cancel some already paid shipments, which were sold back in Belgium for a fraction of the price.

=== Belgian carbines in Serbia ===
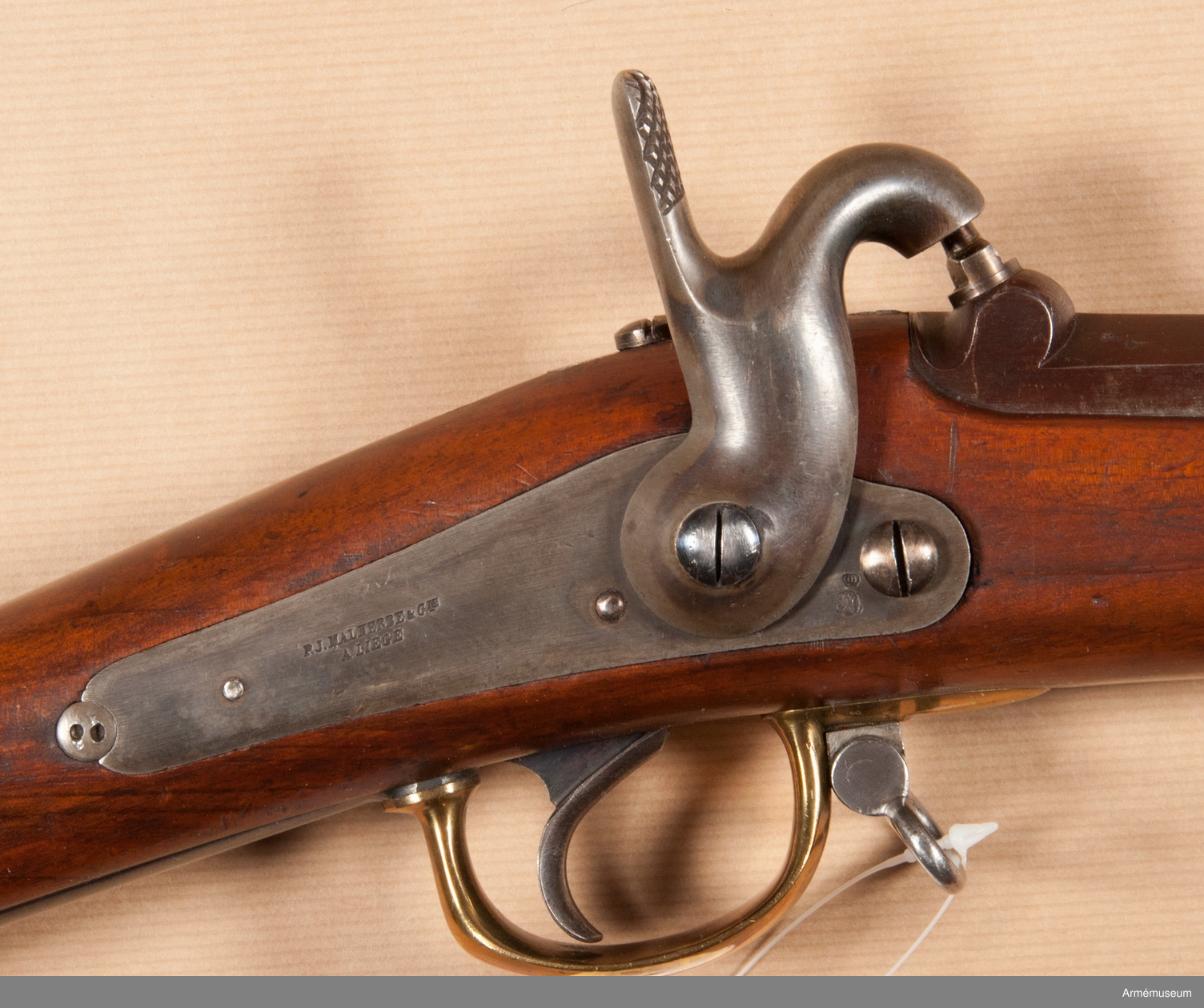
Belgian rifle percussion lock.

Belgian carbines had French type of percussion lock, Minie rifled barrel Cal 17.8 mm with four rifled grooves and a posterior folding sights. Every rifle was equipped with a yatagan-sword bayonet, similar to the French Model 1842 Bayonet. All the weapons were inspected and stamped in the Serbian Rifle Factory in Kragujevac. In 1861, the first military manual for use of these rifles was printed in Belgrade.

Belgian carbines saw their first military use during the crisis of 1862, when some Ottoman soldiers killed a Serbian boy on Čukur-česma in Belgrade. That crime sparked massive riots of local Serbian population, after which the Ottoman garrison in the Kalemegdan Fortress bombarded Belgrade with cannon. Armed with Belgian carbines, Serbian sharpshooters have easily shot most of the Ottoman cannoners on the fortress walls, from the distance of some 500–700 m.

The last military use for these rifles was in Serbian-Ottoman wars (1876-1878), when 7,000 of these rifles were among the 65,000 of percussion rifles used by the 32 Second Class battalions of the Serbian National Militia. A Russian volunteer, colonel Bobikov, praised these rifles for their precission and reliability on the short distances and rugged terrain. After the war, the remaining Belgian carbines were handed to the Second Class of the People's Militia, and were retained in the equipment of the Third Class as late as 1889. For the last time these rifles were fired in anger by the rebels during the Timok Rebellion of 1883.

In 1862. price of these rifles was 50 ducats (about 600 groshen), in 1875. it was 168 groshen, and in 1877 about 80 groshen (16 dinars). As a comparison, a Serbian lieutenant's monthly pay in 1878. was no more than 72 groshen.

The last remaining carbines were decommissioned in 1894 and sold to civilians for 5 dinars (25 groshen) apiece.
