= Lefaucheux-Francotte M. 71 =

1871 Belgian revolver

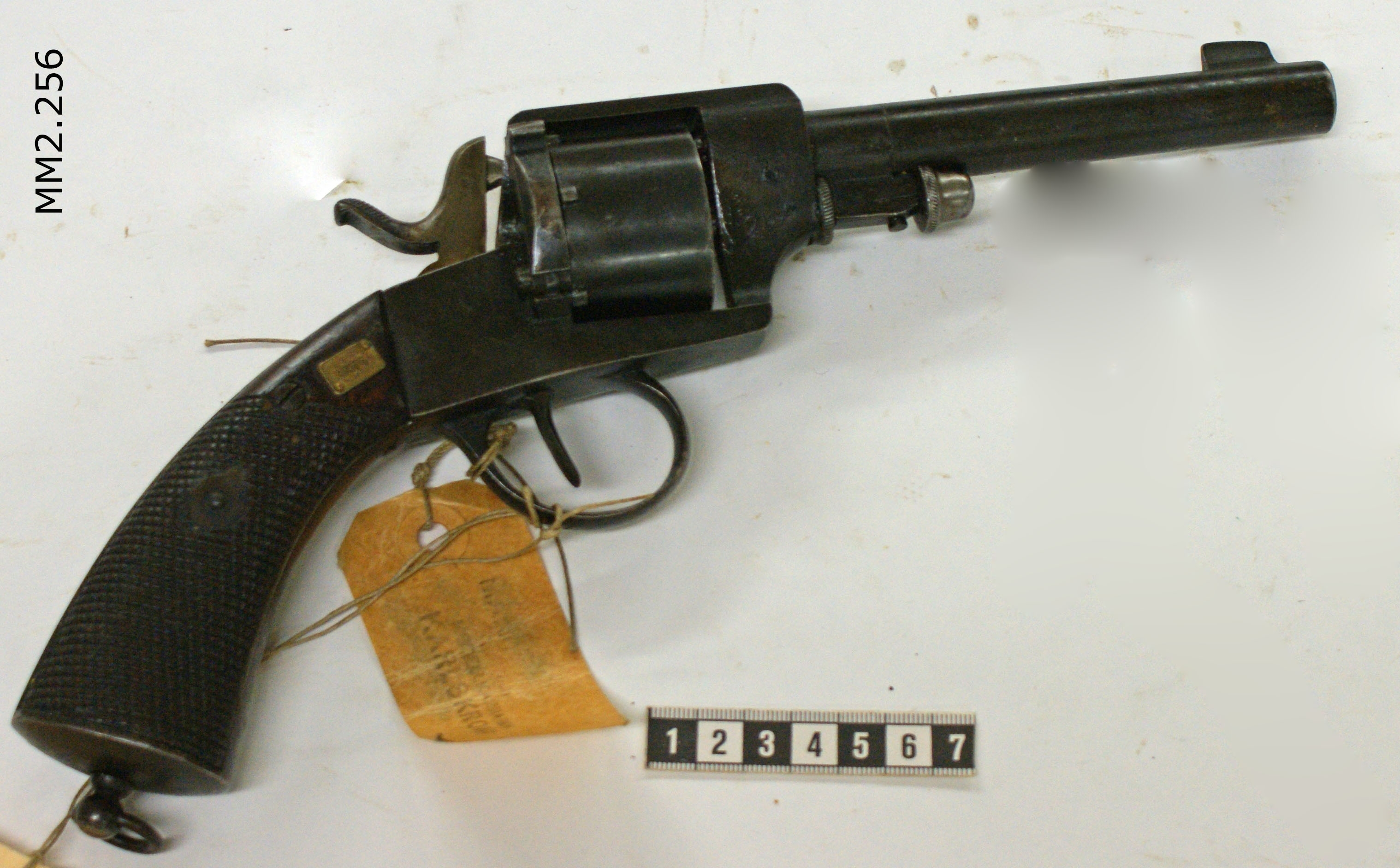
- Lefaucheux-Francotte Model 1871, Marinmuseum, Sweden.
- Type: Revolver
- Place of origin: Belgium

Service history
- In service: 1871–1914
- Used by: See § Users
- Wars: Serbian–Ottoman Wars (1876–1878); First Balkan War; Second Balkan War

Production history
- Designed: 1871
- Manufacturer: Auguste Francotte&Comp., Liege, Belgium
- No. built: 7,000 for Sweden

Specifications
- Mass: 1.17 kg (2.6 lb)
- Length: 305 mm (12.0 in)
- Barrel length: 150 mm (5.9 in)
- Caliber: 11 mm
- Action: Double-action
- Muzzle velocity: 160 m/s (520 ft/s)
- Effective firing range: 50 m (160 ft)
- Feed system: 6-round cylinder
- Sights: Blade front sight, hammer notch rear sight

Lefaucheux-Francotte M. 71 or Revolver m/1871 was a 19th-century Belgian revolver made for Swedish military. It was also the first service revolver of the Principality of Serbia.

== Production ==
In the second half of the nineteenth century, Auguste Francotte of Liege was one of the largest Belgian arms factories, mostly manufacturing rifles and revolvers for export. Francotte's first breechloading revolver was Model 1865, double action revolver chambered for 11 mm pinfire cartridges, made for the Danish Navy.

== Design ==
Revolver m/1871 has a Lefaucheux-Francotte double action system with solid frame and fixed cylinder, with no mechanical extractor. Made for Swedish army, it was chambered for 11 mm centerfire cartridges. In 1875, Principality of Serbia bought several thousands of these revolvers for the Serbian military.

Model 1871 was a very similar, but slightly smaller weapon made at the same time for the Danish military, but chambered for 11 mm pinfire cartridges.

== Users ==
- Principality of Serbia
- Sweden − Issued to cavalry, field artillery, and signalling units.

== See also ==
- Green percussion rifle, contemporary Serbian service rifle.
