= Hyppolyte Mondain =

Serbian Minister of War

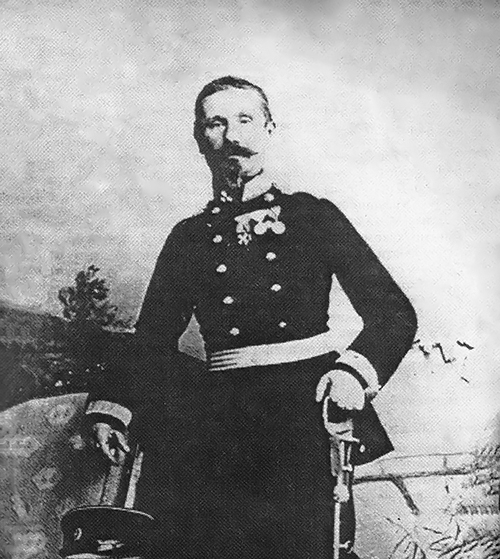
Hyppolyte Mondain

Hippolyte Florentain Mondain (24 April 1811 in Paris, First French Empire – 11 January 1900 in Paris, French Third Republic) was the first Serbian Minister of War. Originally from France, Mondain was invited to take over the newly formed Ministry of Defence at the initiative of the State Council of the Principality of Serbia, which he did from 1862 to 1865. He significantly reformed the Army of the Principality of Serbia and gave it the basis on which it later developed. While he was a captain of engineers in France, Mondain was sent to Belgrade from 1853 to 1856 with a mission to study the possibilities of defending Serbia if it was drawn into the Crimean War. He implemented a series of reforms to organize the Serbian army according to the French model. For those merits, he was awarded the title of honorary general.

== Biography ==
Very little biographical information was preserved about Hippolyte Mondain. He was born in 1811 in France. It is to the credit of Ilija Garašanin for having him engaged in the Serbian Army. During Garašanin's official stay in Paris in 1853, he met the then engineering captain Hyppolite Mondain, who left a strong impression on him. After that meeting, Garašanin concluded that the Serbian army needed such an officer. With his consent, after obtaining the approval of the French government, he brought Mondain to the Principality of Serbia that year and made him available to the Serbian government. Mondain lived in the Principality of Serbia for the first time from 1853 to 1855. During that time, he was engaged in making plans for the defence of Serbia, in a war situation that prevailed in Crimean War at the time. To carry out this work, he travelled to Serbia, studying it. He left a favourable impression on the authorities in Serbia, as a man capable of this job, and at the same time, suitable for cooperation. However, as a peaceful situation arose at the end of the Crimean War, it was assessed by the government that this work was completed and he returned to France.

Hyppolite Mondain found himself in Serbia for the second time in 1861. The prince's representative Filip Hristić, writing on 16 March 1861, to the State Council, on behalf of Prince Mihailo Obrenović, states:

The Government of His Majesty, in concern for the progress of the state, realized that some professions must procure state works from capable and professionally-trained people to whom their administration and organization could be entrusted with confidence. So far, it has been found necessary that one such person should be procured for the construction profession. The choice of the Government fell on Monsieur Mondain, Commander of the Engineering Corps in Amiens, France, when talent and ability are recognized everywhere, and who left the most beautiful memory with his stay in our fatherland. Mr. Mondain received our offer, and the French Government agreed that he should enter our service.

A decree of 22 September 1861, Major Hyppolite Mondain of the French Army was appointed Chief of the Main Military Administration, in place of Konstantin Hranisavljević. Mondain, who was at the same time promoted to the rank of colonel of the Serbian army. With the establishment of the Central State Administration on 10 April 1862, the former Main Military Administration, which was under the jurisdiction of the Ministry of the Interior, grew into the Ministry of War. Colonel Ipolit Florenten Mondain, the former head of the Main Military Administration, was appointed head of the newly formed ministry. He showed his military knowledge during the bombing of Belgrade by the Turks in 1862. As Minister of War, he took command of the army and successfully organized fortifications for defence. By declaring a state of siege, he managed to thwart all the intentions of the Turks with quick movements of the army.

In addition to these jobs, he faced other problems. It was necessary to organize the standing army as well as possible. It benefitted greatly in the long run from Mondain's expertise. For the systems implemented by Mondain to function better, the Law on the Organization of the Standing Army Headquarters was passed at Mondain's suggestion. The newly formed body relieved him of some jobs and the competencies were transferred to the Chief of the newly formed Staff. The organization of the Serbian army was done according to the French system, which replaced the previous Russian system. He was the initiator of changes in the legal provisions on recruitment. Changes were made in the health service of the army with the introduction of military paramedics. Later, he prepared a large number of legal projects related to officers (weapons, salaries, pensions). Rules have also been made according to which the conditions for assistance from the special fund for the retirement of non-commissioned officers and soldiers are determined. The heating plant in Kragujevac was completely renovated during his tenure and significant progress was made in the production of gunpowder and ammunition. From 27 April 1862, in the cabinet of Ilija Garašanin, in which he was the Minister of War, he also represented the Minister of Construction. He resigned from both positions on 2 April 1865, exceeding the obligation he gave when he arrived in the Principality of Serbia.

Mondain did everything in his power to prepare the Serbian army as well as possible. Prince Mihailo Obrenović himself sent him a letter of gratitude during his dismissal. He thanked him for his cooperation over the past four years and acknowledged:

"... to the zeal and loyalty with which you have distinguished yourself for the entire duration of your service and which make it a pleasant memory of your work in Serbia."

After his resignation, Monden returned to France. By the decree of 1 January 1898, in recognition of the merits he did towards Serbia as its first Minister of War, he was awarded the title of honorary general of the Serbian army. He died in Paris on 11 January 1900, at the age of 89.

== Family ==
Colonel Mondain had (at least) one son, Georges, known by the pseudonym Monval (1845-1910) ("son of the genius Colonel Mondain, commander of the Legion of Honor"). Georges was an actor, archivist of the Comedie-Française and founder of a magazine dedicated to Molière. Georges Monval was also the author of Les théâtres subventionnés (Paris, 1879).

== Decorations ==
He was a Commander of the National Order of the Legion of Honor of the Third French Republic.

== Sources ==
- Милићевић, Милић; Поповић, Љубодраг (1998). Министри Војни Кнежевнине и Краљевине Србије [Military Ministers of the Principality and Kingdom of Serbia]. Military Publishing House. ISBN 978-86-335-0035-7.
- Poinsot, Edmond Antoine (1869). Dictionnaire des pseudonymes. Slatkine. GGKEY:A9S3LYHJF9G.
