= Morisawa =

Morisawa may refer to:

== Organizations ==
- Morisawa (company), a Japanese photocomposition and type company

== Surname ==
- Fumi Morisawa, Japanese voice actor
- Marie Morisawa (1919–1994), US geomorphologist
- Sachiko Morisawa (born 1945), Japanese table tennis player
