= .224 Valkyrie =

Intermediate rifle cartridge

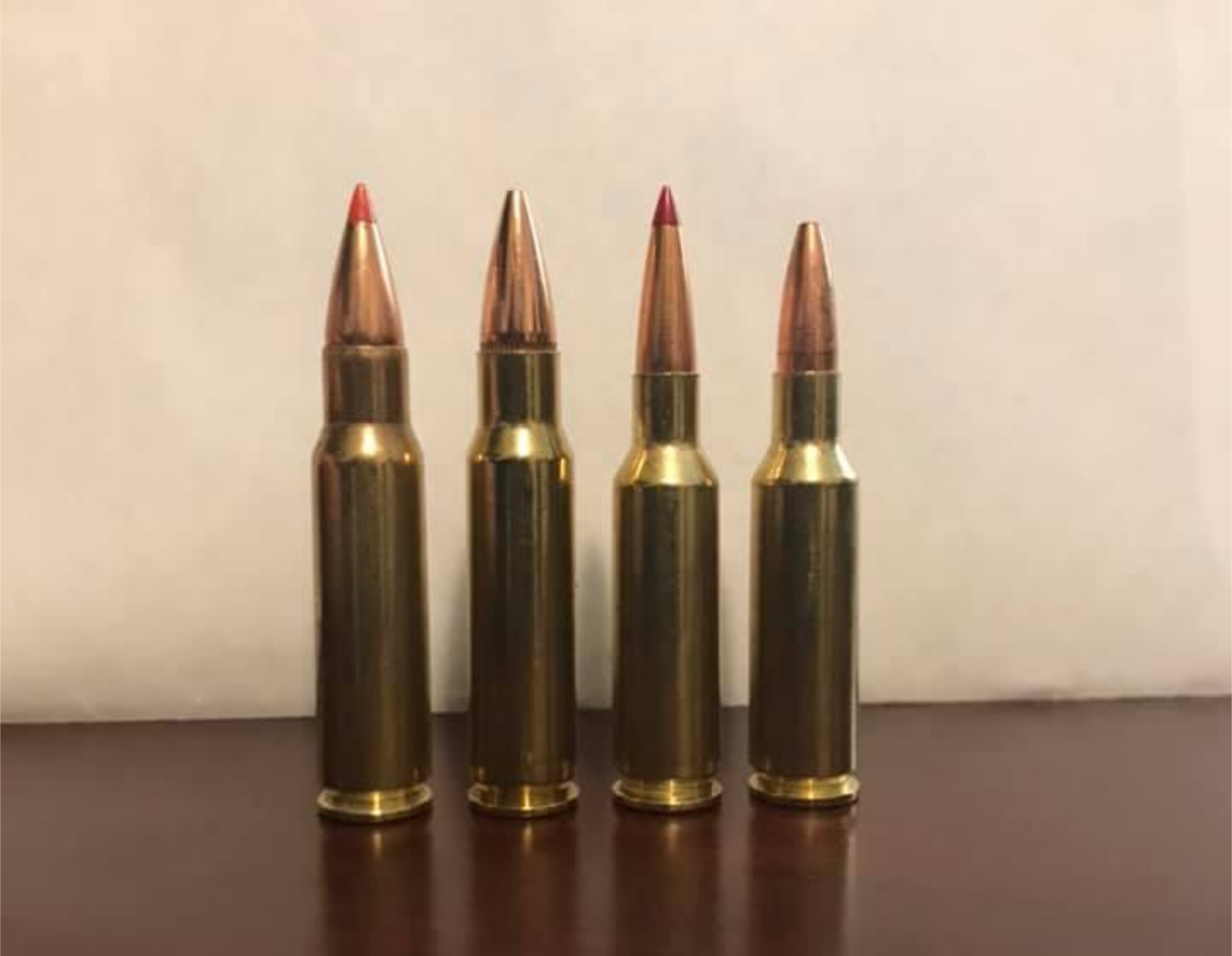
- From left: 6.8 SPC (110gr VMax), 6.8 SPC (90gr JHP), .224 Valkyrie (88gr ELD), .224 Valkyrie (75gr FMJ)
- Type: Rifle
- Place of origin: United States

Production history
- Designer: Federal Ammunition
- Designed: 2017

Specifications
- Parent case: 6.8 SPC/.30 Remington
- Case type: Rimless, bottlenecked
- Bullet diameter: 0.2245 in (5.70 mm)
- Neck diameter: 0.2560 in (6.50 mm)
- Shoulder diameter: 0.4031 in (10.24 mm)
- Base diameter: 0.4207 in (10.69 mm)
- Rim diameter: 0.422 in (10.7 mm)
- Rim thickness: 0.049 in (1.2 mm)
- Case length: 1.60 in (41 mm)
- Overall length: 2.260 in (57.4 mm)
- Case capacity: 34.5 gr H_{2}O (2.24 cm^{3})
- Rifling twist: 1 in 7"
- Primer type: Small Rifle
- Maximum pressure (SAAMI): 55,000 psi (379.2 MPa)
- Maximum pressure (C.I.P.): 405.0 MPa (58,740 psi)

Ballistic performance
Bullet mass/type	Velocity	Energy
60 gr (4 g) Nosler BT	3,459 ft/s (1,054 m/s)	1,594 ft⋅lbf (2,161 J)
75 gr (5 g) ELD Match	3,013 ft/s (918 m/s)	1,512 ft⋅lbf (2,050 J)
90 gr (6 g) Fusion SP	2,638 ft/s (804 m/s)	1,391 ft⋅lbf (1,886 J)
- Test barrel length: 24 in Source(s): Hodgdon Reloading

The .224 Valkyrie (5.6×41 mm) cartridge is a .22 caliber (5.6 mm) rimless bottlenecked intermediate rifle cartridge, developed by Federal Premium Ammunition to rival the performance of the .22 Nosler, while still being compatible with modern sporting rifles (MSRs). The case is based on that of the 6.8mm Remington SPC, which in turn was based on the .30 Remington.

== See also ==
- 5 mm caliber
- List of AR platform cartridges
