= Green bullet =

Type of ammunition

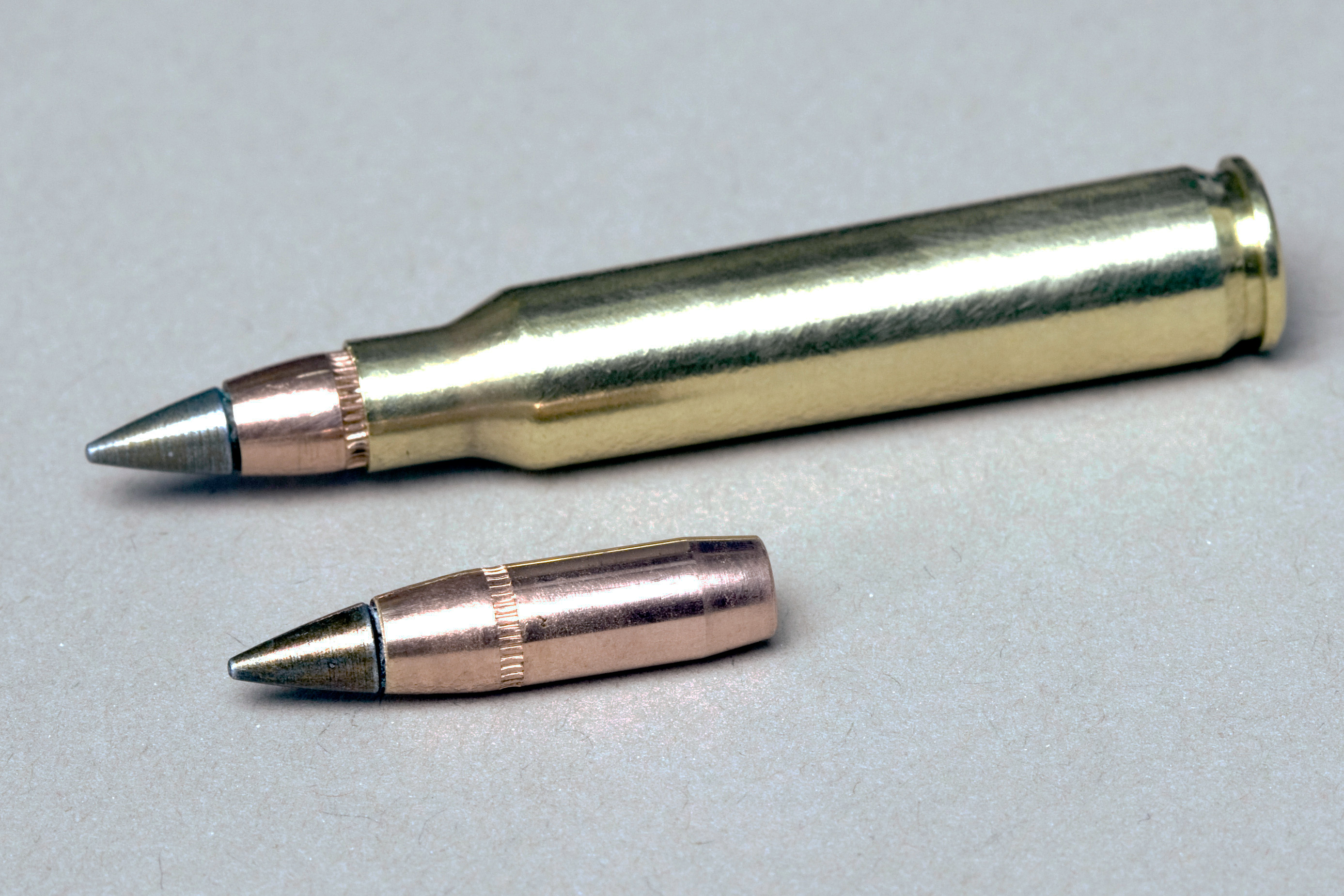
M855A1 projectiles for 5.56×45mm NATO rifles replace traditional lead alloy cores with an environmentally friendly copper core with a 19-grain (1.2 g) steel "stacked-cone" penetrating tip.

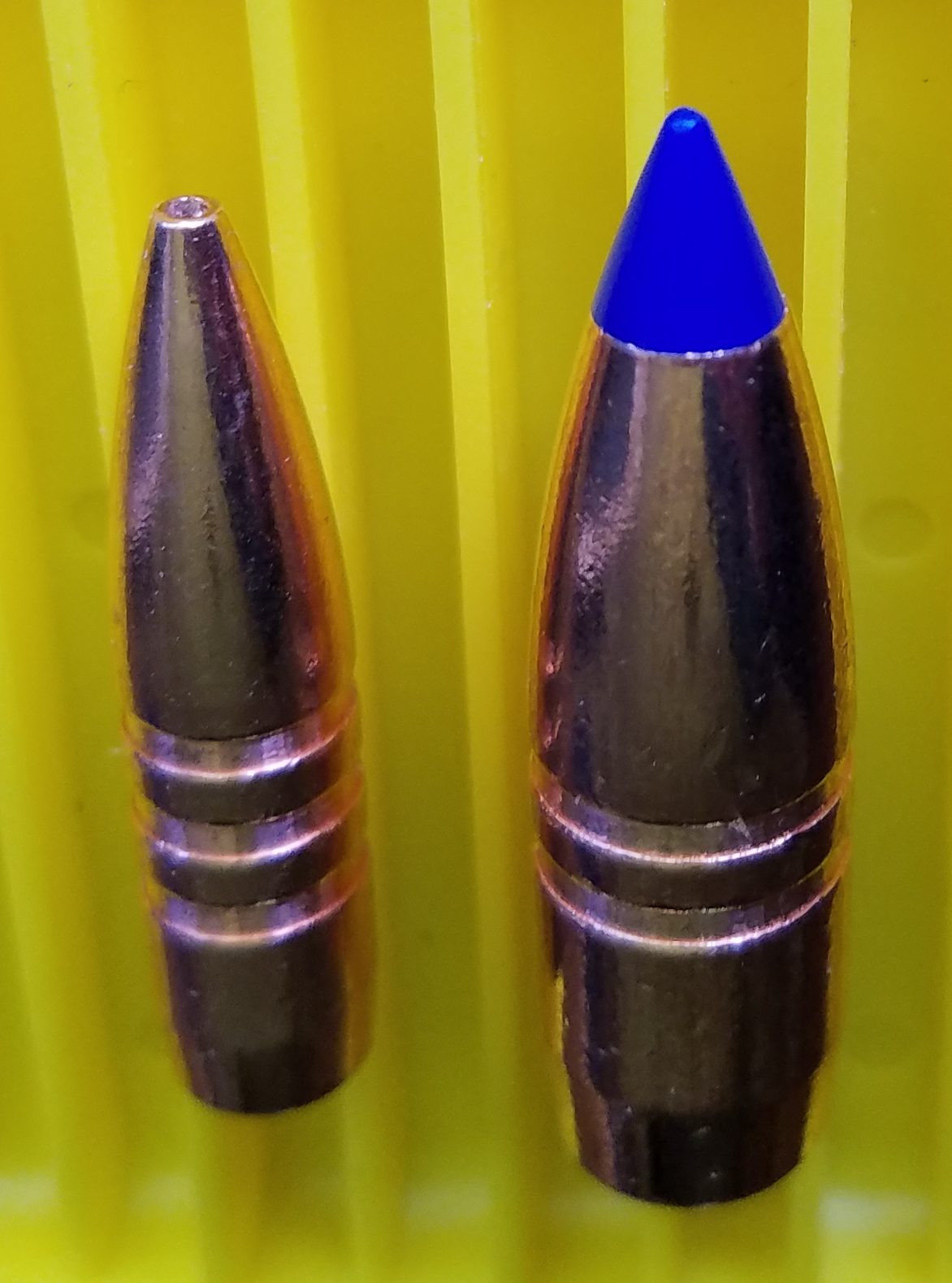
Solid copper bullets typical of the majority of nonlead ammunition certified for hunting in California. The .25 caliber (6.4 mm) bullet on the left has a small cylindrical cavity in the nose, and the .35 caliber (9 mm) bullet on the right has a larger cavity holding an aerodynamic plastic tip.

Green bullet, green ammunition or green ammo are nicknames for a United States Department of Defense program to eliminate the use of hazardous materials from small arms ammunition and from small arms ammunition manufacturing. Initial objectives were elimination of ozone-depleting substances, volatile organic compounds, and heavy metals from primers and projectiles. These materials were perceived as causing difficulties through the entire life cycle of ammunition. The materials generated hazardous wastes and emissions at manufacturing facilities and use of ammunition caused contamination at shooting ranges. Potential health hazards made demilitarization and disposal of unused ammunition difficult and expensive.

The Joint Working Group for Non-Toxic Ammunition was formed by the Small Caliber Ammunition Branch of the United States Army Armament Research, Development and Engineering Center in October 1995. Members of the working group included the National Guard of the United States, the United States Coast Guard, the United States Army Infantry School, the Industrial Operations Command, the Lake City Army Ammunition Plant, the Oak Ridge National Laboratory, the Los Alamos National Laboratory and the United States Department of Energy Kansas City Plant.

== Background ==
In 2013, lead bullet production represented the second largest use of lead in the U.S., after lead-acid batteries. Studies by the U.S. CDC suggest blood lead levels are correlated with self-reported consumption of game meat.

== Legislation ==
October 11, 2013 Governor Jerry Brown of California signed into law AB 711 Hunting: nonlead ammunition. Cost reductions from conversion to green ammo are estimated at "$2.5 million required for waste removal at each outdoor firing range as well as the $100 thousand annual costs for lead contamination monitoring".

== Identified hazardous materials ==
Hazardous material	Location	New material
antimony	projectile	tungsten-tin or -nylon
antimony trisulfide	primer	diazodinitrophenol (DDNP)
barium nitrate	tracer or incendiary projectile	
barium peroxide	primer and tracer or incendiary projectile	diazodinitrophenol
ethyl acetate	blank cartridge tip sealant	Solventless process
ethyl alcohol	tracer or incendiary projectile	
glycol ether	painted projectile point	
lead	projectile	steel tungsten-tin or tungsten-nylon copper
lead dioxide	tracer or incendiary projectile	
lead styphnate	primer	diazodinitrophenol, MIC, e.g. Al/MoO_{3}
methyl chloroform	casemouth sealant and tracer or incendiary projectile	
methyl ethyl ketone	primer and sealants for primer pocket and blank cartridge tip	Solventless process
methyl isopropyl ketone	primer and sealants for primer pocket and blank cartridge tip	Solventless process
toluene	primer and sealants for primer pocket and blank cartridge tip	Solventless process
xylene	sealants for primer pocket and blank cartridge tip	

== Green ammunition ==
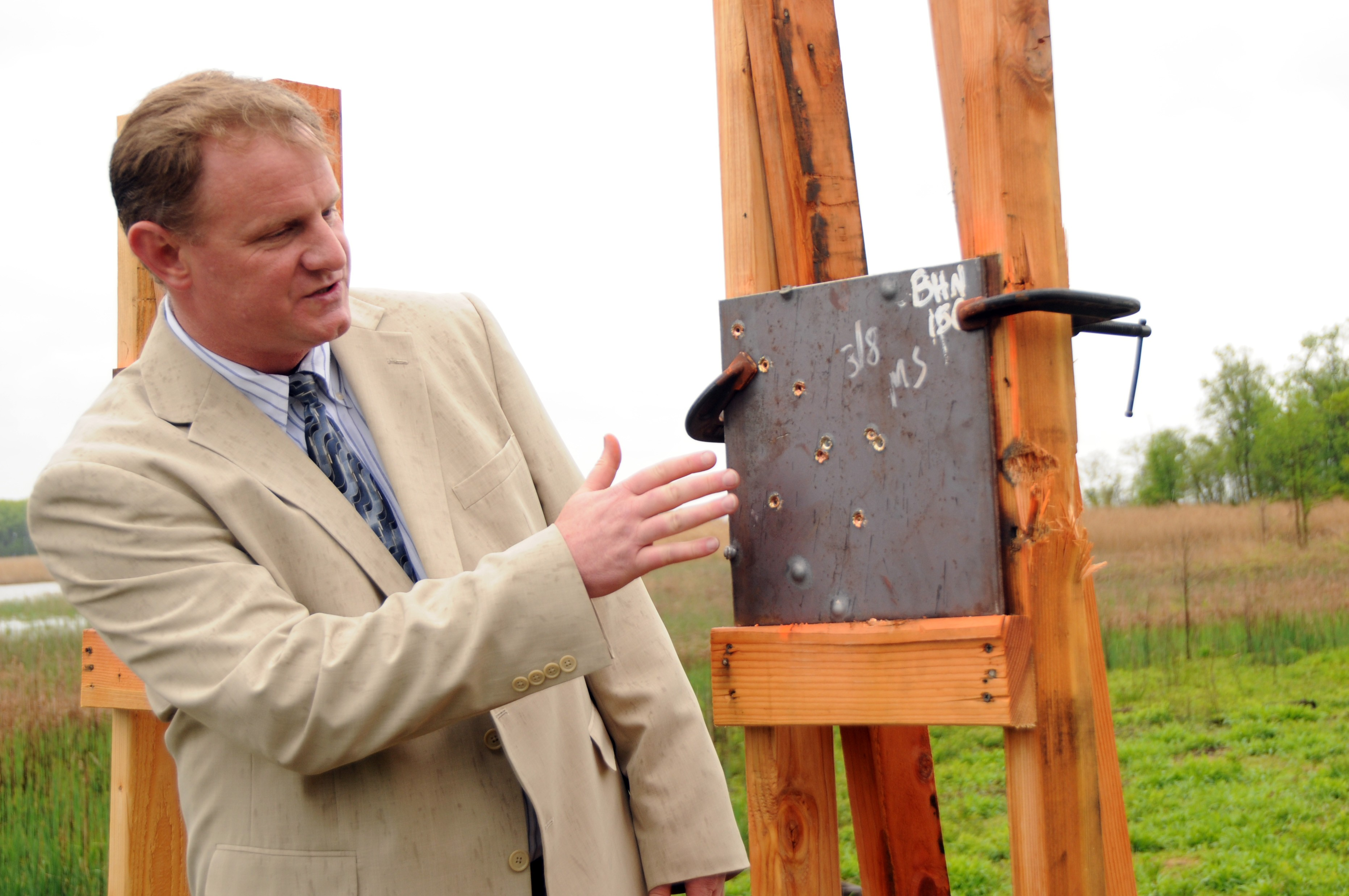
Jim Newill explains the effectiveness of the Army's 5.56mm M855A1 Enhanced Performance Round (2011)

Two green ammunition cartridges are the 5.56×45mm NATO M855A1 and the MK281 40 mm grenade. Switching to the 5.56 mm green bullet, the M855A1 Enhanced Performance Round, or EPR, in 2010 has eliminated nearly 2,000 tons of lead from the waste stream. U.S. Army representatives at a 2013 House Armed Services Committee hearing have credited the 5.56mm M855A1 Enhanced Performance Round "close to" those of a 7.62 mm in its performance capabilities. The longer, less dense M855A1 bullet must be seated deeper than the lead core bullet it replaced to maintain the same exterior cartridge dimensions required for reliable functioning in self-loading firearms; and higher pressure is required to obtain the same bullet velocity with reduced propellant volume. Increased pressure causes gas port erosion producing a higher cyclic rate of automatic fire making jamming malfunctions more likely. Cracks in bolt locking lugs have been observed after 3000 rounds of full automatic fire with the M855A1 cartridge.

Enhanced Performance Round, Lead-Free

The Army Research Laboratory and other participants developed the M855A1, Enhanced Performance Round (EPR), by applying ballistics concepts originally used in large-caliber cartridges to small arms. The result was significant improvements to lethality of small arms. The 5.56-mm (M855A1) ammunition was first battle-tested in mid-2010 in Afghanistan. The 7.62-mm (M80A1) ammunition was fielded in 2014.

The EPR "bronze tip" ammo – previously known generically as "Green Ammo" – was born at the kickoff meeting for Phase II of the Army's Green Ammunition replacement program in mid-2005, at the Lake City Army Ammunition Plant. Participants met to discuss problems surrounding environmentally-friendly small arms training ammunition.

The program team was composed of Project Manager, Maneuver Ammunition Systems (PM-MAS), Army Research Laboratory (ARL), U.S. Army Armaments Research Development and Engineering Center (ARDEC), and other team members. Participants evaluated more than 20 potential projectile designs before moving forward with a three-piece, reverse-jacket bullet design incorporating a hardened steel penetrator and lead-free slug.

The EPR produces consistent effects against soft targets; increased effectiveness at long ranges; increased defeat of hard targets; and reduced muzzle flash (to help conceal soldiers' firing positions). The lead-free cartridges also reduce environmental impact by removing more than 2,000 metric tons of lead per year that otherwise could end up in the environment.

The EPR contains an environmentally-friendly projectile that eliminates lead from the manufacturing process in direct support of Army commitment to environmental stewardship. Under the Green Ammo Phase II initiative, the Army focused on lead-free ammo in stateside training ranges, in response to tightening state environmental regulations.

== Wildfire considerations ==
Some of a bullet's kinetic energy is typically converted to heat if the bullet strikes a hard surface like rock. Collision debris may include high temperature bullet fragments as sparks. Steel core and solid copper ammunition have the highest potential to start wildfires. Lead core bullets are less likely to ignite surrounding vegetation.

== Rifling considerations ==
Rifling is required to stabilize elongated bullets, and longer bullets require faster rotation for similar stability. The rate of rotation is determined by the twist of the lands and grooves engraved on the interior of a rifled barrel. Twist is usually expressed as the length of barrel (in inches) in which the bullet will rotate through a full 360 degrees; so bullets fired from a 1:10" twist rifle will make a complete rotation in every 10 inches (25 cm) of distance traveled.

Since lead is a very dense material, bullets made of inexpensive, non-toxic materials will be lighter than bullets made of lead unless bullet length is increased. Inferior external ballistics cause lighter bullets to be less effective against distant targets. Increasing bullet length may require a faster rifling twist to maintain stability. Some early trials versions of the M16 rifle had 1:14" twist barrels, but this was increased to 1:12" twist in early military production to improve stability with 55-grain (3.6 g) M193 lead-core bullets in the early 5.56×45mm NATO cartridges. Twist was increased to 1:9" after combat experience demonstrated the advantages of longer 62-grain (4.0 g) M855 bullets with a portion of the lead core replaced by a less dense steel penetrator. Barrels with 1:7" twist have been used in 21st century 5.56×45mm NATO firearms and have replaced barrels of older United States military firearms to stabilize longer M856 tracer bullets and M855A1 green bullets of less dense materials.

== See also ==
- Shotgun shell § Lead free
- Shot (pellet) § Bird lead poisoning
