= Nosler =

American manufacturing company

- Industry: Ammunition
- Founded: 1948
- Founder: John A. Nosler
- Headquarters: Bend, Oregon, US
- Area served: Worldwide
- Products: Ammunition, handloading components, Firearms, Bullets, Brass
- Owner: Bob Nosler
- Divisions: Nosler, Inc., Nosler Custom, Nosler Reloading
- Website: http://www.nosler.com/

Nosler, Inc. is an American manufacturing company based in Bend, Oregon, known for producing ammunition and handloading components and specializing in high-performance hollow-point and soft-point hunting bullets. The current companies also include subsidiaries Nosler Custom and Nosler Reloading. Nosler's contributions to shooting sports include both polymer-tipped bullet designs and new manufacturing techniques used in their production.

== Early history ==
John Amos Nosler was born on April 4, 1913, in Brawley, California. While hunting moose in British Columbia in 1946, while using his Winchester Model 70 chambered in .300 H&H Magnum, the bullets he was using failed to penetrate deeply enough to reach vital organs and kill the animal quickly. At the time, most jacketed bullets employed a single copper alloy envelope (the jacket) around a single lead alloy core. The jacket on most military bullets was closed in front and opened at the base. These full metal jacket bullets offered good penetration, but often failed to expand and passed completely through an animal leaving a comparatively small wound. Soft-point hunting bullets like Nosler was using had the jacket applied in the opposite direction to completely cover the base, but open at the nose. These bullets would expand to leave a large wound channel, but sometimes broke into small pieces with inadequate momentum to overcome resistance of moving through bone or muscle tissue.

The experience inspired Nosler to develop a new bullet design, intended to expand readily at low impact velocities yet maintain integrity at high impact velocities (see terminal ballistics). These Nosler Partition bullets used a specially designed jacket enclosing two separate lead alloy cores. The front core was open on the nose to expand easily, but expansion would stop at the partition (which was a solid layer of copper extending right across the bullet, not just the thin shell of copper which composed the jacket). The portion of the bullet behind the partition has the structural integrity of a full metal jacket bullet, but the expanded forward jacket leaves a larger wound channel. Bullets were originally manufactured for personal use, using hand made, lathe-turned jackets. In 1948 Nosler began to sell the partition bullets commercially, forming Nosler, Inc.

Further innovations by Nosler included new techniques of manufacturing bullet jackets that yielded more consistent expansion, better core bonding techniques to prevent separation of the lead core from the copper jacket, and the plastic Ballistic Tip (polymer nose cone) used to provide hollow point bullets a streamlined shape of boat tail Spitzer bullets. The Nosler Ballistic Tip design has been copied by other manufacturers, such as the V-Max, ELD and A-Tip (aluminum tip) series bullets by Hornady. John Nosler sold the production facilities to his son in 1988, and died at his home in Bend, Oregon, on October 10, 2010.

== Company information ==
Today, Nosler makes a number of different hunting bullets for rifle, handgun, and muzzle-loaders. They also manufacture brass and sell loaded ammunition, and Nosler Custom has recently begun to sell limited edition and semi-custom hunting rifles. The original Partition design bullet still is the company's flagship product. It has undergone many refinements over the years, but the basic design concept has remained unchanged.

== Company news ==
Nosler experienced a massive explosion at their plant in Bend, Oregon, on June 2, 2010. No one was harmed in the blast.

In February 2015, Nosler announced plans to expand their long-standing operations in Bend, Oregon to their neighboring city of Redmond, where the company purchased 60 acres of undeveloped land in December 2014. Construction of a 30,000 sq. ft. building is planned for completion in 2016 and will house Nosler's growing ammunition and cartridge brass operations, including the manufacturing of their SSA by Nosler product line based on the company's acquisition of Silver State Armory in 2013. The expansion is expected to add approximately 20 jobs in Central Oregon and will allow the original Bend plant to focus exclusively on bullet production.

== Company developments ==
In 2006 Nosler announced its very first rifle offering, the Model 48 Trophy Grade.

Nosler announced the company's first proprietary cartridge, the 26 Nosler, as the world's most powerful 6.5mm cartridge commercially available during SHOT Show in January 2014. In January 2015, Nosler introduced the company's second cartridge, the 28 Nosler, a 7mm rifle cartridge based on the 26 Nosler case. Since their release, the 26 Nosler and 28 Nosler have been known for high muzzle velocities and extremely flat trajectories. The parent case for both cartridges is based on the .300 Remington Ultra Magnum case.

In October 2014, Nosler introduced Ballistic Tip Ammunition as the latest product offering in their factory loaded ammunition. The ammunition is loaded exclusively with Nosler's line of Ballistic Tip hunting bullets, a polymer-tipped projectile made popular by the company when introduced in 1984 as a premium choice for hunting medium-sized game such as deer, antelope and wild hogs. The Ballistic Tip Ammunition line pairs the performance of the Ballistic Tip projectile with Nosler's own component brass.

Late 2014 Nosler revamped the Model 48 line. It did away with the Trophy Grade Rifle and replaced it with the Patriot Rifle. The new rifle has a Basix trigger and Bell and Carlson stock. For the most accuracy out of the Patriot, Nosler incorporated an aluminum bedding chassis into the aramid-fiber reinforced carbon fiber stock, and the barrel is free-floated. The stock is a hand laid-up laminate that is elephant gray with black epoxy webbed over the surface. Which means it's never going to warp or crack. The comb is straight with a pancake cheekpiece and a thick, solid pistol grip. The Patriot rifle chambered in .26 Nosler should be an effective hunting combination from the mountains to the prairies.

Early 2016 Nosler introduced its third cartridge the .30 Nosler.

October 2016 Nosler introduces a new line of Competition / Target Bullets - RDF Bullets

October 2016 Nosler introduces the .33 Nosler

January 2017 Nosler introduced the .22 Nosler.
