= Cast bullet =

Made by allowing molten metal to solidify in a mold

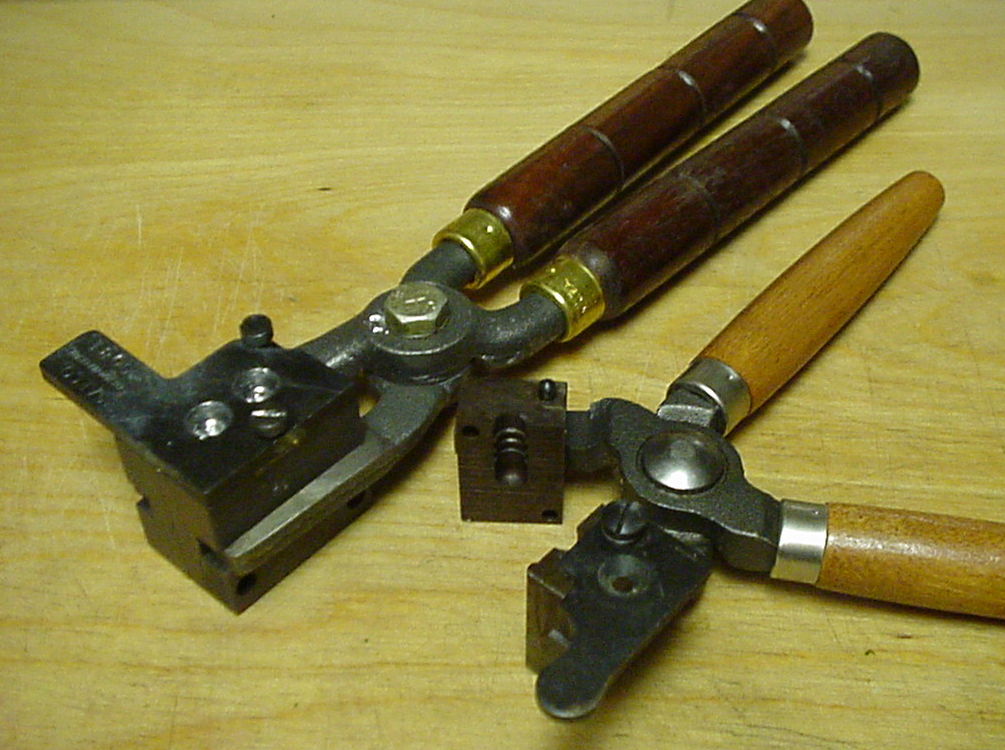
An open single-cavity bullet mold and a closed two-cavity mold.

A cast bullet is made by allowing molten metal to solidify in a mold. Most cast bullets are made of lead alloyed with tin and antimony, but zinc alloys have been used when lead is scarce. Most commercial bullet manufacturers use swaging in preference to casting, but bullet casting remains popular with handloaders.

Firearms projectiles were being cast in the 14th century. Iron was used for cannon, while lead was the preferred material for small arms. Lead was more expensive than iron, but it was softer and less damaging to the relatively weak iron barrels of early muskets. Lead could be cast in a ladle over a wood fire used for cooking or home heating, while casting iron required higher temperatures. Greater density of lead allowed lead bullets to retain velocity and energy better than iron bullets of the same weight and initial firing velocity.

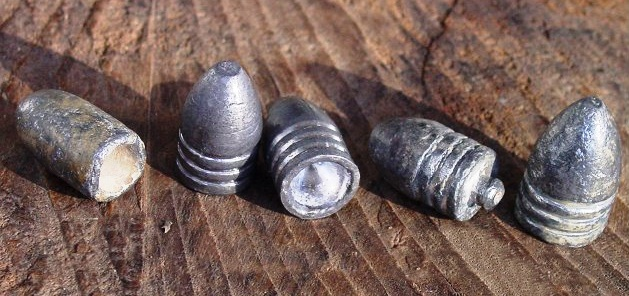
Minié balls of the mid-19th century could be either cast or swaged.

Swaging, rather than casting, became a preferred manufacturing technique during the 19th century Industrial Revolution, but cast bullets remained popular in early rimmed black powder cartridges like the .32-20 Winchester, .32-40 Ballard, .38-40 Winchester, .38-55 Winchester, .44-40 Winchester, .45 Colt, and .45-70. Disadvantages became evident as loadings shifted to smokeless powder in the late 19th century. Higher velocity smokeless powder loadings caused lead to melt and be torn from soft bullets to remain in the barrel after firing in small deposits called leading. Manufacturers of high-velocity military ammunition modified their bullet swaging process to apply a thin sheet of stronger metal over the soft lead bullet. Although it took several decades to devise bullet jacket alloys and manufacturing procedures to duplicate the accuracy of cast bullets at lower velocities, jacketed bullets are more accurate at the velocity of 20th century military rifle cartridges. Jacketed bullets also function more reliably and are less likely to be deformed in the mechanical loading process of self-loading pistols and machine-guns.

== Cast bullet advantages ==
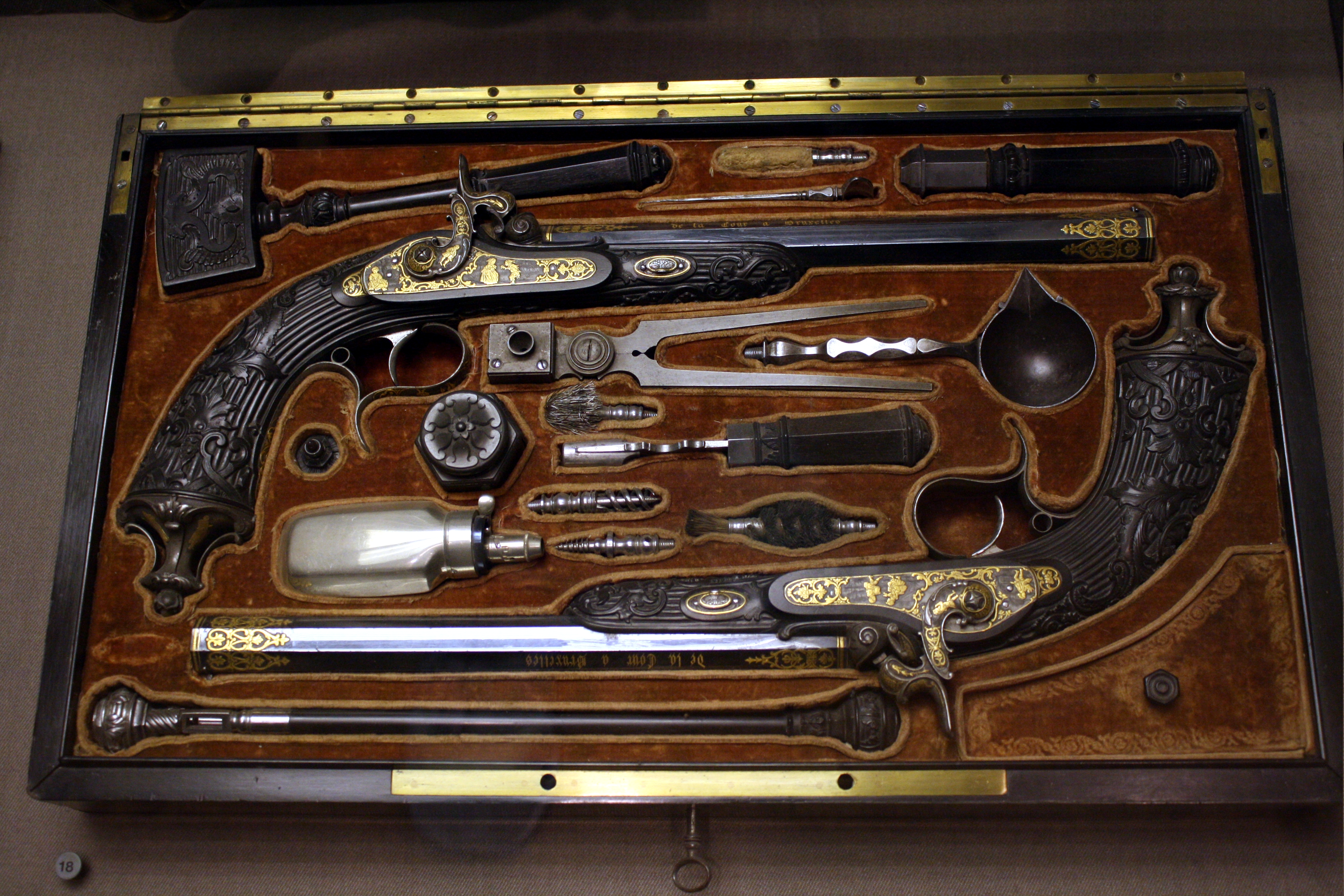
A pair of French, 19th century Duelling pistols. The set of accessories includes a small casting ladle and a bullet mold, so the owner may make their own bullets, Philadelphia Museum of Art (2009)

Bullet casting remained popular for shooters accustomed to older weapons. Firearms were often sold with a mould designed for that particular weapon, so individuals living in remote areas would be able to manufacture their own ammunition rather than relying upon undependable supplies from local merchants. The uniform fit of bullets from an individual mould offered superior accuracy when early manufacturing tolerances were comparatively large.

These basic advantages remain true today. Moulds can be obtained to uniformly cast bullets of a diameter producing optimum accuracy in a specific firearm, and a firearm owner possessing such a mould can obtain a supply of those bullets independent of unreliable manufacturers and distributors. Bullets cast over a fireplace or stove from readily obtainable scrap materials still offer excellent performance in subsonic revolver cartridges, and more sophisticated casting techniques can produce bullets suitable for loading at velocities up to about 2,000 feet per second (610 m/s). Recent advances in Cast Bullet Lubes have enabled shooters to be able to push cast bullets past 2,800 feet per second (850 m/s) in slow twist 30 cal rifles.

== Safety ==
Although some bullet casting procedures can be accomplished with heating elements used for cooking, care must be taken to avoid contaminating food preparation areas and/or utensils with lead alloys. Most bullet casters prefer to use portable electric melting pots in areas with good ventilation. Molten metal can cause serious burns, and molten metal can be sprayed around the working area by violently expanding steam if it comes in contact with water from spilled drinks or other sources. Bullet casters should wear protective clothing including eye protection, and should carefully wash hands prior to eating, drinking, or smoking. Young children are especially vulnerable to lead poisoning and are unlikely to appreciate the danger of shiny molten metal and newly cast bullets. Bullet casting must be limited to times and locations when children are absent.

== Bullet shapes ==
Cast bullets require a longer bearing surface than jacketed bullets to maintain an equivalent alignment with the bore of the firearm, because the softer cast bullet can be more readily deformed. The most successful cast bullet designs have a round or flattened nose rather than a long, unsupported ogive. Bullet designs with a forward diameter designed to be supported on the rifling lands work best in barrels rifled with wide lands and narrow grooves like the 2-groove M1903-A3 rifles. Forward bearing surfaces of full groove diameter provide more effective alignment in barrels with wide grooves and narrow lands, provided the chamber throat is long enough to accept such bullets.

== Gas checks ==
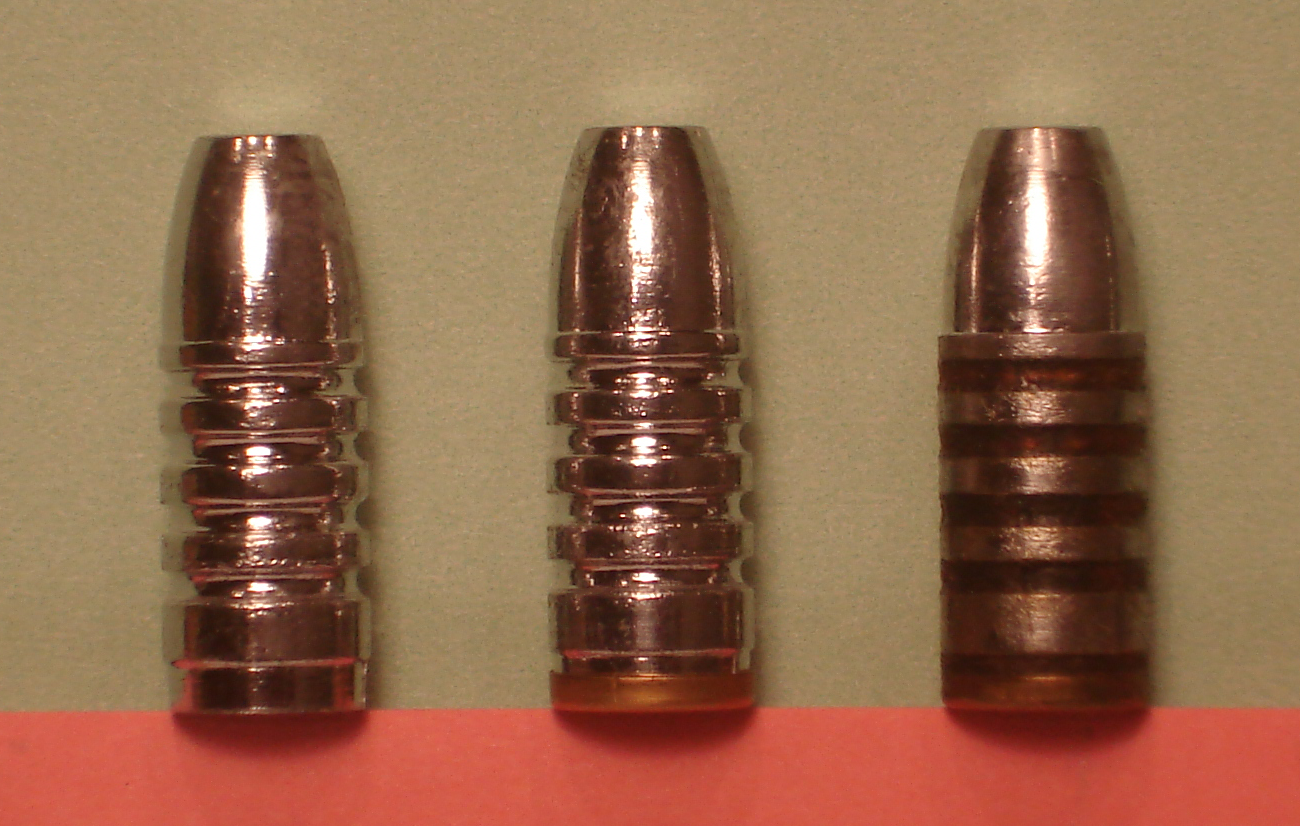
Cast bullets as cast (left), fitted with a gas check (center) and sized & lubricated (right)

One of the earlier efforts to obtain better high-velocity performance involves placing a very shallow cup of copper alloy over the base of the bullet. This cup resembles a very short jacket and is called a gas check. Cast bullets require a smaller diameter at the base to accept the gas check. Some gas checks are designed to crimp onto the base of the bullet, while others have a looser fit.

== Bullet lubrication ==
Tallow or Lard was used as a lubricant to ease the insertion of muzzle loaded bullets. Elongated rifle bullets were designed to be cast with grooves encircling the bullet to provide a reservoir for lubricant. These lubricants softened the black powder fouling for easier removal and reduced the tendency of bullets to leave deposits of lead in the barrel as they were fired. The latter advantage continued to be significant with smokeless powder. Attempts to obtain satisfactory high-velocity performance with cast bullets have included experimentation with a variety of lubricant mixtures including such things as beeswax, carnauba wax, Japan wax, bayberry wax, paraffin, petroleum jelly, sperm oil, castor oil, stearyl alcohol, lauryl alcohol, graphite, molybdenum disulphide, mica, zinc oxide, Teflon, cup grease, lithium soap, water pump grease, and a variety of more modern lubricating materials.

== Bullet alloys ==
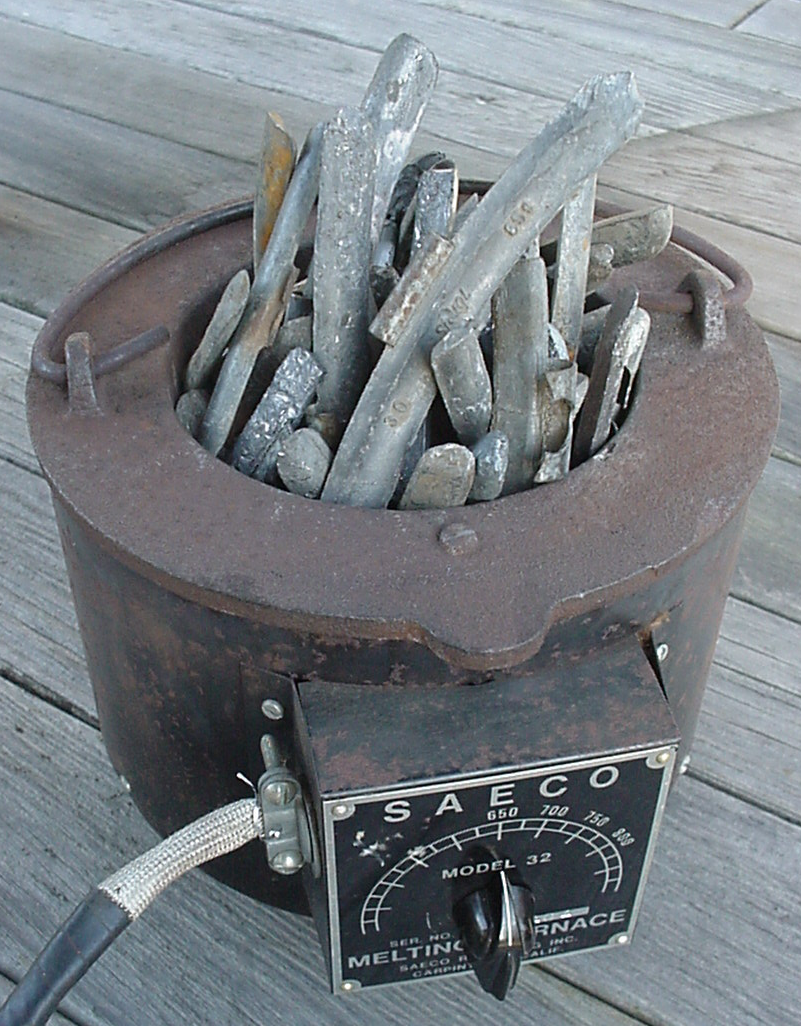
Electric melting pot charged with automobile wheel weights in preparation for bullet casting. A small amount of solder will be added after the steel clips and slag have been skimmed from the melt.

Pure lead was used to cast hollow-base bullets for Civil War era muskets. These bullets were designed to load easily and then expand into the grooves of the rifling when fired. Pure lead is undesirably soft for casting bullets not requiring such expansion. Tin is a common alloying element. Lead alloyed with a small amount of tin fills out moulds more uniformly than pure lead. Tin also increases the hardness of cast bullets up to a maximum at about eight to ten percent tin. Tin is relatively expensive, so many modern alloys rely upon antimony to increase hardness while retaining the casting advantages of a minimal addition of tin. Linotype metal is a eutectic alloy of 3% tin, 12% antimony, and 85% lead. It is a very satisfactory alloy for casting most bullets. However, bullets from Linotype alloy tend to be brittle, and not suitable for some game hunting.

== Heat treating ==
Heat treating can increase the hardness of commonly used lead alloys. The basic procedure is to rapidly cool, or quench, hot bullets. Some suggest this can be done by dropping hot bullets from the mold into a tub of water, but this procedure carries the risk of splashing water onto the mold or into the molten casting metal and causing a steam explosion. An alternative procedure is to re-heat cast bullets (usually in a wire mesh basket) in a temperature-controlled oven and then remove and quench. The oven temperature should be less than the melting temperature of the bullet alloy. This temperature will vary with the concentrations of alloying elements, but is often in the range of 450 to 500 degrees Fahrenheit (232 to 260 degrees Celsius).

== Paper-patched bullets ==
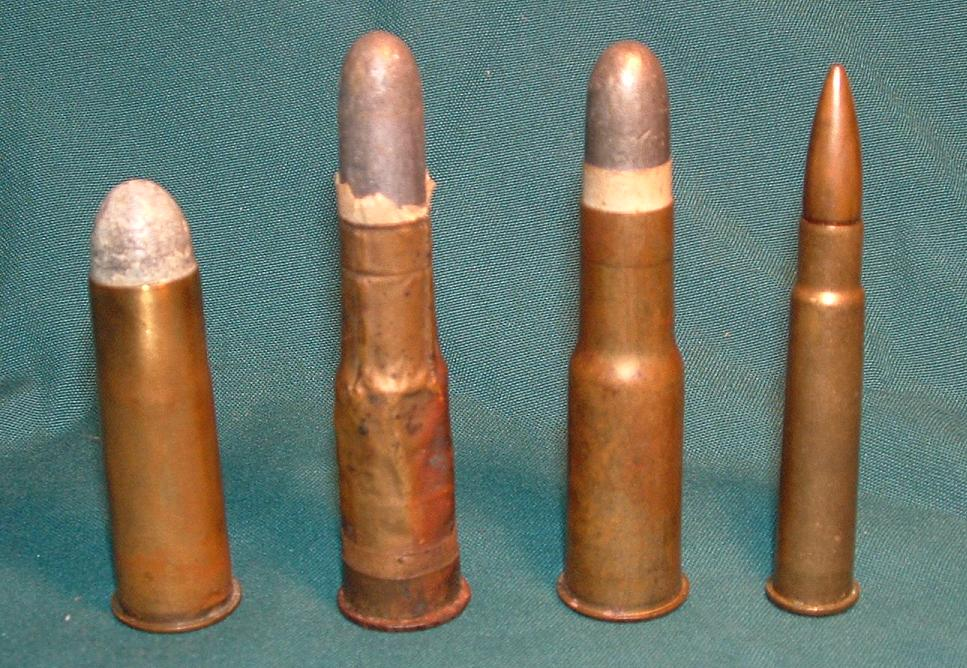
A selection of historic, British military ammunition. The center two are .577/450 Martini–Henry paper-patched rounds

As velocity increased and rifling was introduced a problem of lead remaining in the bore was of concern. One of the earlier attempts, which is still popular today with muzzle loaders and users of black powder rifles, prevents leading and obtains potentially better velocity and performance with cast projectiles involves application of a paper jacket. Patching is the hand process of applying paper jackets. The projectile is cast to a diameter that is usually that of the bore and needs to be brought up to groove diameter by a uniform number of paper wrappings. Some prefer a relatively strong paper precisely cut to wrap exactly twice around the bullet with no overlap where the ends meet. Others substitute a range of papers from wax doped rice paper used for rolling cigarettes through greased cooking paper, waxed confectionery paper bags, printer labels and even silicone impregnated baking paper. The width of the piece of paper is slightly longer than the bearing surface of the projectile, so some paper extends past the base and is folded or twisted under. Some projectile have a base cavity into which the twisted end fits. The paper patch is moistened slightly with water to make it more pliable and slightly sticky. The patch is carefully wrapped around the bearing surface of the bullet. The lip of paper extending past the base of the bullet is then twisted together, and may be pushed into a depression cast into the base of the bullet. The lubricant may be allowed to evaporate after the jacket has been applied, and a different lubricant may be applied after the formed paper has dried. Very good accuracy has been obtained with paper-patched bullets, but the assembly procedure is relatively labor-intensive. There is some question about whether the accuracy improvements result from the paper jackets or from the greater uniformity of shooting procedures by people with the patience to apply the patches. A small number of dedicated target shooters still load paper-patched bullets at velocities up to about 2,000 feet per second (610 m/s).
