= Nosler cartridges =

High-performance hunting cartridges

Nosler produces six different rebated rim hunting cartridges. The first to be introduced was .26 Nosler, followed by .28 Nosler, .30 Nosler, .33 Nosler, .22 Nosler, and .27 Nosler.

== .22 Nosler ==
22 Nosler
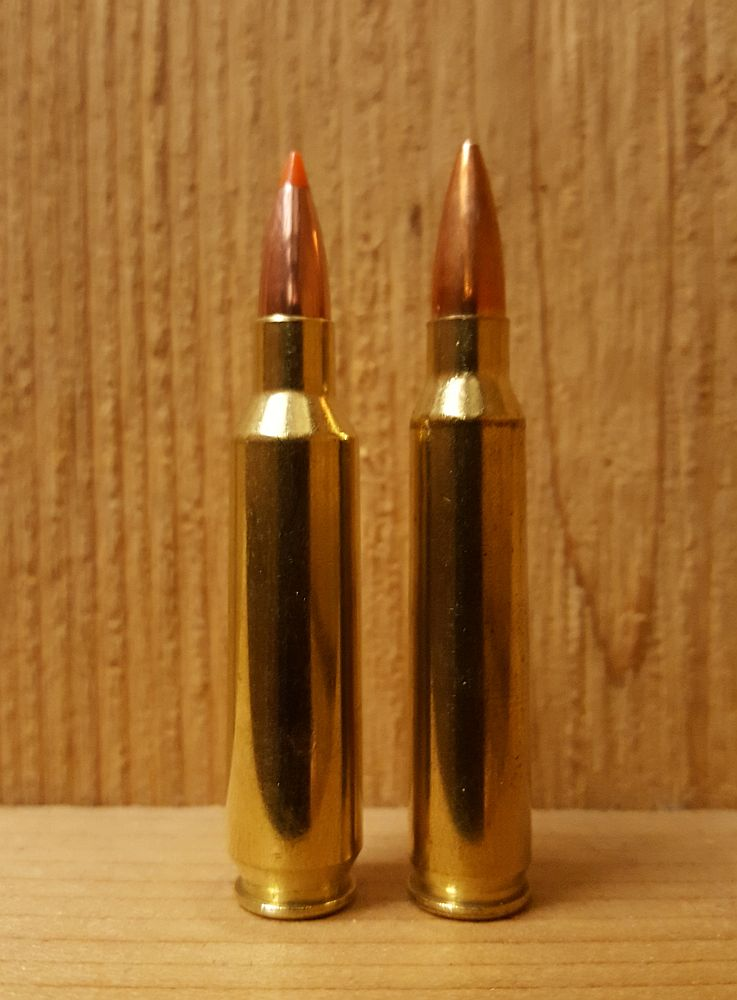
- .22 Nosler (left), .223 Remington (right)
- Type: Rifle
- Place of origin: United States

Production history
- Designer: Nosler
- Designed: 2017

Specifications
- Case type: Rebated rim, bottlenecked
- Bullet diameter: 5.7 mm (.224 in)
- Neck diameter: 6.5 mm (.255 in)
- Shoulder diameter: 10.2 mm (.400 in)
- Base diameter: 10.69 mm (.4207 in)
- Rim diameter: 9.6 mm (.378 in)
- Rim thickness: 1.1 mm (.045 in)
- Case length: 44.7 mm (1.760 in)
- Overall length: 57.4 mm (2.260 in)
- Rifling twist: 1 in 8 inches (203 mm)
- Maximum pressure (SAAMI): 380 MPa (55,000 psi)

Ballistic performance
Bullet mass/type	Velocity	Energy
55 gr (3.6 g)	3,500 ft/s (1,100 m/s)	1,496 ft⋅lbf (2,028 J)

The .22 Nosler is a .22-caliber (.224 in; 5.6 mm), rebated-rim centerfire rifle cartridge designed by Nosler. The .22 Nosler is a SAAMI approved and standardized cartridge.

=== Background ===
In January 2017 Nosler introduced the .22 Nosler. It is the fifth cartridge designed by Nosler. It is claimed that the .22 Nosler delivers 25% more case capacity and is nearly 90 m/s (300 ft/s) faster than a .223 Remington/ 5.56 NATO. The .22 Nosler is designed to use the existing bolt face of an AR-15, and conversions to this caliber can be accomplished with a simple barrel swap. The shoulder is set back slightly compared to the 5.56 cartridge to prevent accidentally chambering a 5.56 cartridge in a .22 Nosler rifle. The case diameter and taper resemble those of the 6.8mm Remington SPC, so Nosler recommends using a magazine designed for that cartridge. While similar to the 6.8 SPC in some regards, there is no parent case and the .22 Nosler cannot be formed from 6.8 SPC brass. The .224 Valkyrie is a similar cartridge, but the two are not interchangeable.

=== Barrel Life ===
Barrel life ranges from 2,000 to 4,000 rounds depending on use.

== .26 Nosler ==
26 Nosler
- Type: Rifle
- Place of origin: United States

Production history
- Designer: Nosler
- Designed: 2013

Specifications
- Parent case: .300 Remington Ultra Magnum
- Case type: Rebated rim, bottlenecked
- Bullet diameter: 6.7 mm (.264 in)
- Neck diameter: 7.54 mm (.2970 in)
- Shoulder diameter: 13.40 mm (.5275 in)
- Base diameter: 13.97 mm (.5500 in)
- Rim diameter: 13.6 mm (.534 in)
- Rim thickness: 1.3 mm (.050 in)
- Case length: 65.8 mm (2.590 in)
- Overall length: 84.8 mm (3.340 in)
- Case capacity: 93.5 gr H_{2}O (6.06 cm^{3})
- Rifling twist: 1 in 9 inches (2296 mm)
- Primer type: Large rifle magnum
- Maximum pressure (SAAMI): 65,000 psi (450 MPa)

Ballistic performance
Bullet mass/type	Velocity	Energy
120 gr (7.8 g)	3,388 ft/s (1,033 m/s)	3,060 ft⋅lbf (4,150 J)
140 gr (9.1 g)	3,300 ft/s (1,000 m/s)	3,160 ft⋅lbf (4,280 J)
- Test barrel length: 24"; Source

The .26 Nosler (6.5×66mmRB) is a rebated-rim centerfire rifle cartridge designed by Nosler and first announced in November 2013. It is the first cartridge designed by Nosler.

=== Background ===
The name .26 Nosler refers to the first two digits in the caliber (0.264 in; 6.7 mm) of the bullets that the cartridge fires and the name of the company which created it.

The .26 Nosler is designed as a modern 6.5mm cartridge, using recent advances in firearm technology to attain exceptionally high muzzle velocities, up to 1,040 m/s (3,400 ft/s), and maintain an extremely flat trajectory. The overall cartridge length of 84.8 mm (3.340 in) is the same as that of the .30-06 Springfield, allowing the use of widely available standard-length actions.

Four of Nosler's Cartridges, the .26 Nosler, .28 Nosler, .30 Nosler, and .33 Nosler, are based on the same .300 Remington Ultra Magnum parent case. While the .26 Nosler and the .28 Nosler share the same cartridge case dimensions, the .30 Nosler has a slightly shorter length to the shoulder dimension than the .26 Nosler and the .28 Nosler, and the .33 Nosler has a shorter shoulder length dimension than that of the .30 Nosler.

=== Performance ===
When released, the .26 Nosler was claimed to be the most powerful commercial 6.5 mm cartridge in the world. The .26 Nosler, when loaded with 8.4 g (129 gr) AccuBond Long Range very-low-drag bullets, retains as much velocity at 370 m (400 yd) as the .260 Remington produces at the muzzle.

=== Barrel Life ===
The high velocity of the .26 Nosler cartridge has raised concerns about excessive barrel wear, potentially wearing down barrels at a rate faster than that of the similar .264 Winchester Magnum, which itself has a reputation for being a "barrel burner".

=== Specifications ===
The .26 Nosler cartridge specifications have been submitted to SAAMI and a data sheet is currently available.

== .27 Nosler ==
.27 Nosler
- Type: Rifle
- Place of origin: United States

Production history
- Designer: Nosler
- Designed: 2020

Specifications
- Parent case: .404 Jeffery
- Case type: Rebated rim, bottlenecked
- Bullet diameter: 7.06 mm (.2780 in)
- Neck diameter: 7.98 mm (.3140 in)
- Shoulder diameter: 13.42 mm (.5282 in)
- Base diameter: 13.97 mm (.5500 in)
- Rim diameter: 13.6 mm (.534 in)
- Rim thickness: 1.3 mm (.050 in)
- Case length: 65.8 mm (2.590 in)
- Overall length: 84.8 mm (3.340 in)
- Case capacity: 2,500 mm (98.4 in)
- Rifling twist: 1 in 8.5 inches
- Primer type: Large rifle magnum

Ballistic performance
Bullet mass/type	Velocity	Energy
150 gr (10 g)	3,300 ft/s (1,000 m/s)	3,638 ft⋅lbf (4,932 J)
- Test barrel length: 26"; Source: https://www.nosler.com/27-nosler

Nosler adds a new cartridge in 2020, the .27 Nosler. Nosler plans to use a 1:8.5" (216 mm) twist barrel for their M48 rifles chambered in .27 Nosler. Nosler will be offering their complete line of M48 rifles in the .27 Nosler chambering. Initial factory loads will include the 9.7 g (150 gr) AccuBond and the 10.7 g (165 gr) AccuBond Long Range (ABLR) bullets. For handloaders, Nosler will also offer fully prepared Nosler brass, bullets and reloading data for the .27 Nosler. RCBS reloading dies are also currently available for the cartridge. When firing a 9.7 g (150 gr) AccuBond Long Range bullet from a rifle with a 660 mm (26 in) barrel, the .27 Nosler has an approximately 120 m/s (400 ft/s) advantage over the .270 Winchester, about a 90 m/s (300 ft/s) advantage over the .270 WSM, and about a 30–46 m/s (100–150 ft/s) velocity advantage over the .270 Weatherby. The primary use for the .27 Nosler is hunting.

== .28 Nosler ==
.28 Nosler
- Type: Rifle

Production history
- Designed: 2015

Specifications
- Parent case: .300 Remington Ultra Magnum
- Case type: Rebated rim, bottlenecked
- Bullet diameter: 7.21 mm (.2840 in)
- Neck diameter: 8.1 mm (.320 in)
- Shoulder diameter: 13.4 mm (.528 in)
- Base diameter: 14.0 mm (.550 in)
- Rim diameter: 13.6 mm (.534 in)
- Rim thickness: 1.3 mm (.050 in)
- Case length: 65.8 mm (2.590 in)
- Overall length: 84.8 mm (3.340 in)
- Case capacity: 93.8 gr H2O (6.08 ml)
- Rifling twist: 1 in 9 inches
- Primer type: Large rifle magnum
- Maximum pressure (SAAMI): 450 MPa (65,000 psi)

Ballistic performance
Bullet mass/type	Velocity	Energy
160 gr (10.4 g)	3,191 ft/s (973 m/s)	3,596 ft⋅lbf (4,876 J)
180 gr (11.7 g)	3,081 ft/s (939 m/s)	3,795 ft⋅lbf (5,145 J)
150 gr (9.7 g)	3,262 ft/s (994 m/s)	3,545 ft⋅lbf (4,806 J)
- Test barrel length: 24"; Source

The .28 Nosler is a 7 mm (.284") caliber, rebated-rim centerfire rifle cartridge designed by Nosler. Introduced in 2015 and approved by SAAMI on January 19, 2015. It is the second cartridge designed by Nosler

=== Background ===
The name .28 Nosler refers to the first two digits in the caliber (0.284 in; 7.2 mm) of the bullets that the cartridge fires and the name of the company which created it.

The .28 Nosler is based on the .26 Nosler which was released in 2014. The .28 Nosler shares the same overall cartridge length of 84.8 mm (3.340 in) as the .26 Nosler which allows it to be chambered in standard-length action. This feature helps weight-conscious sportsmen to lighten their load before venturing into the backcountry. The cases’ overall length also aids in quick follow-up shots, since the bolt stroke is shorter than on a magnum action.

Four of Nosler's Cartridges the .26 Nosler, .28 Nosler, .30 Nosler, and the .33 Nosler are based on the same .300 Remington Ultra Magnum parent case. While the .26 Nosler and the .28 Nosler share the same cartridge case dimensions, the .30 Nosler has a slightly shorter length to the shoulder dimension than the .26 Nosler and the .28 Nosler, and the .33 Nosler has a shorter shoulder dimension yet than that of the .30 Nosler.

=== Design Considerations ===
The .28 Nosler is essentially a shortened version of the 7mm Remington Ultra Magnum (7mm RUM). They share a maximum body diameter of 14.0 mm (0.550 in). Rebating the rim to 13.6 mm (0.534 in) simplifies the production of rifle bolts since the rims of Holland & Holland-style belted magnums, such as the 7mm Remington Magnum and .300 Winchester Magnum, are the same diameter. Whereas the 7mm RUM case measures 60.6 mm (2.387 in) long from head to body-shoulder juncture, that dimension on the .28 Nosler case is 55.0 mm (2.166 in). The dimension at that point on the .28 Nosler case is 0.051 mm (0.002 in) larger, and that reduces its body taper by just a tad. Maximum case lengths are 72.4 mm (2.850 in) and 65.8 mm (2.590 in) respectively. Shoulder angles are 30 degrees for the Remington cartridge and a slightly sharper 35 degrees for the Nosler. Due to its greater length, the Remington case is about 25 percent more capacious than the Nosler.

=== Barrel Life ===
Since the .28 Nosler burns smaller powder charges than the 7mm RUM, barrel accuracy life is potentially a bit longer. How much longer depends on a number of things, including barrel quality and whether a barrel is regularly cleaned and serviced or abused by its owner.

=== Reloading ===
The .28 Nosler cartridge case can be formed by "necking up" or expanding the neck of a .26 Nosler case to 7 mm (.284") diameter.

== .30 Nosler ==
.30 Nosler
- Type: Rifle
- Place of origin: United States

Production history
- Designer: Nosler
- Designed: 2016

Specifications
- Parent case: .300 Remington Ultra Magnum
- Case type: Rebated rim, bottlenecked
- Bullet diameter: .308in
- Neck diameter: 8.7 mm (.344 in)
- Shoulder diameter: 13.4 mm (.528 in)
- Base diameter: 14.0 mm (.550 in)
- Rim diameter: 13.6 mm (.534 in)
- Case length: 64.9 mm (2.556 in)
- Overall length: 84.8 mm (3.340 in)
- Case capacity: 89.8 grains of H2O (5.82 ml)
- Rifling twist: 1 in 10 inches (254 mm)
- Primer type: Large rifle magnum
- Maximum pressure (SAAMI): 450 MPa (65,000 psi)

Ballistic performance
Bullet mass/type	Velocity	Energy
180 gr (11.7 g)	3,110 ft/s (950 m/s)	3,866 ft⋅lbf (5,242 J)
210 gr (13.6 g)	2,902 ft/s (885 m/s)	3,928 ft⋅lbf (5,326 J)
230 gr (14.9 g)	2,811 ft/s (857 m/s)	4,036 ft⋅lbf (5,472 J)
- Test barrel length: 24"; Source

The .30 Nosler is a 30-caliber (.308 in; 7.62 mm), rebated-rim centerfire rifle cartridge designed by Nosler. Introduced in 2016, the .30 Nosler is a SAAMI approved and standardized cartridge. It is the third cartridge designed by Nosler

=== Background ===
The name .30 Nosler refers to the first two digits in the caliber (0.308 in; 7.62 mm) of the bullets that the cartridge fires and the name of the company which created it.

This is Nosler's third cartridge following its predecessors the .26 Nosler which was released in 2014 and the .28 Nosler which was released in 2015. The .30 Nosler shares the same overall cartridge length 84.8 mm (3.340 in) as the .26 Nosler and the .28 Nosler which allows it to be chambered in standard-length action firearms.

Four of Nosler's Cartridges, the .26 Nosler, .28 Nosler, .30 Nosler, and .33 Nosler, are based on the same .300 Remington Ultra Magnum parent case. While the .26 Nosler and the .28 Nosler share the same cartridge case dimensions, the .30 Nosler has a slightly shorter length to the shoulder dimension than the .26 Nosler and the .28 Nosler, and the .33 Nosler has a shorter shoulder dimension yet than that of the .30 Nosler.

The .30 Nosler was released in January 2016. Later in October 2016, Nosler continued to add to the cartridge family by releasing the .33 Nosler, and in January 2017 they introduced the .22 Nosler.

=== Performance ===
According to a recent Nosler publication, the .30 Nosler surpasses the velocity of the .300 Weatherby Magnum, headspaces off of the shoulder like a .300 Remington Ultra Magnum and fits the same standard length action of a 300 Winchester Magnum.

== .33 Nosler ==
.33 Nosler
- Type: Rifle

Production history
- Designed: 2016

Specifications
- Parent case: .300 Remington Ultra Magnum
- Case type: Rebated rim, bottlenecked
- Bullet diameter: 8.6 mm (.338 in)
- Neck diameter: 9.3 mm (.368 in)
- Shoulder diameter: 13.4 mm (.529 in)
- Base diameter: 14.0 mm (.550 in)
- Rim diameter: 13.6 mm (.534 in)
- Case length: 62.5 mm (2.460 in)
- Overall length: 84.8 mm (3.340 in)

Ballistic performance
Bullet mass/type	Velocity	Energy
225 gr (14.6 g) Nosler AccuBond	3,025 ft/s (922 m/s)	4,589 ft⋅lbf (6,222 J)
265 gr (17.2 g) Nosler AccuBond LongRange	2,775 ft/s (846 m/s)	4,545 ft⋅lbf (6,162 J)

The .33 Nosler is a .33-caliber (.338 in; 8.6 mm), rebated-rim centerfire rifle cartridge designed by Nosler. Introduced in 2016 (production release 2017), the .33 Nosler is a SAAMI approved and standardized cartridge. It is the fourth cartridge designed by Nosler.

=== Background ===
The name .33 Nosler refers to the first two digits in the caliber (0.338 in; 8.6 mm) of the bullets that the cartridge fires and the name of the company which created it.

The .33 Nosler is Nosler's fourth cartridge following its predecessors the .26 Nosler which was released in 2014, the .28 Nosler which was released in 2015, and the .30 Nosler which was released in 2016. The .33 Nosler shares the same overall cartridge length 84.8 mm (3.340 in) as the .26 Nosler, the .28 Nosler, and the .30 Nosler, which allows it to be chambered in standard-length action firearms.

Four of Nosler's Cartridges, .26 Nosler, .28 Nosler, .30 Nosler and .33 Nosler, are based on the same .300 Remington Ultra Magnum parent case. While the .26 Nosler and .28 Nosler share the same cartridge case dimensions, the .30 Nosler has a slightly shorter length to the shoulder dimension than the .26 Nosler and .28 Nosler, and the .33 Nosler has a shorter shoulder dimension yet than that of the .30 Nosler.

=== Performance ===
According to a recent Nosler publication the .33 Nosler surpasses the velocity of the .338 Lapua Magnum by 25fps while burning 18% less powder. The .33 Nosler is built on the same action length as the .338 Winchester Magnum but launches projectiles at a higher velocity.

=== Availability ===
The .33 Nosler was released in 2017 with Nosler supplying ammunition and components. Nosler is also offering rifles chambered in the .33 Nosler in its Liberty and Heritage lines, with the first rifle being the M48 Western.

== See also ==
- .338 Winchester Magnum
- .338 Lapua Magnum
- 6.5-300 Weatherby Magnum
- 6.5 Creedmoor
- 6.5x55 Swedish
