= Morisawa (company) =

Japanese company

Morisawa Inc.

- Headquarters
- Native name: 株式会社モリサワ
- Formerly: Photo Typesetting Machine Manufacturing Co., Ltd.; Morisawa Photo Typesetting Machine Manufacturing Co., Ltd.
- Type: Kabushiki gaisha
- Industry: Information and communications
- Incorporated: December 1948
- Founded: July 1924
- Founder: Nobuo Morisawa
- Headquarters: Naniwa-ku, Osaka, Japan
- Key people: Yoshiaki Morisawa (Chairman and Representative Director); Akihiko Morisawa (President and Representative Director)
- Products: Digital fonts, software
- Revenue: ¥12 billion (FY2024)
- Net income: ¥343 million (FY2025)
- Total assets: ¥18.014 billion (FY2025)
- Number of employees: 355 (2024)
- Website: www.morisawa.co.jp

Morisawa Inc. (株式会社モリサワ, Morisawa Inc.) is a Japanese company headquartered in Naniwa-ku, Osaka, that develops and sells fonts for desktop publishing, typesetting software, and print-on-demand systems. The company developed the first Japanese-language PostScript fonts and has held the largest share of the Japanese font software market. It was founded as a manufacturer of manual phototypesetting machines and later developed computerized phototypesetting systems.

== History ==
=== Founding to computerized phototypesetting ===
The company was founded by Nobuo Morisawa. Together with Mokichi Ishii, he established the Phototypesetting Machine Research Institute, later known as Sha-Ken, and supported the development of its early machines as an engineer. Morisawa later left the company, reportedly because of differences of opinion, and in 1948 independently founded Photo Typesetting Machine Manufacturing Co., Ltd. This company became the present-day Morisawa after changing its name in 1971.

The company's headquarters are in Naniwa-ku, Osaka; its original headquarters were in Nishinari-ku, Osaka. Yoshiaki Morisawa, the founder's second son, was Chief Executive Officer and Chairman, while Akihiko Morisawa was Chief Operating Officer and President.

During the era of manual phototypesetting machines, Morisawa was described as "the typeface company, Sha-Ken; the machine company, Morisawa" and held second place in the market. It retained this position as the industry transitioned to computerized phototypesetting. Compared with Sha-Ken, Morisawa developed a smaller number of typefaces independently.

For computerized phototypesetting, while Sha-Ken developed systems based entirely on its own specifications, Morisawa partnered with Linotype and developed systems based on Linotype technology. This later contributed to the opening of the company's typeface designs to wider use.

Beginning in 1984, Morisawa held the International Typeface Competition Morisawa Awards every three years, making it an influential force in Japanese typeface design. The competition was suspended for a period, but the Type Design Competition 2012 was held in 2012. Some of the typefaces that won these competitions were subsequently released by Morisawa.

=== Promotion of desktop publishing ===
When the wave of desktop publishing using the Macintosh arrived, Sha-Ken pursued its own approach and did not make its typefaces openly available. Morisawa instead partnered with Adobe and chose to sell its typefaces as fonts for the Macintosh.

Although the decision initially attracted skepticism both inside and outside the company, and there was considerable competition over which fonts would become industry standards, Morisawa's typefaces established a strong position as a de facto standard in desktop publishing throughout the 1990s. The company also overtook Sha-Ken, which had been the industry's leader in annual sales during the manual phototypesetting era, and became the market leader. (Note: Morisawa's annual sales were ¥18.7 billion in 1998, compared with ¥17.5 billion for Sha-Ken.)

Morisawa began releasing OpenType fonts in 2002, laying the groundwork for the next generation of desktop publishing. This made the company's popular typefaces available in Windows environments as well. Because there was substantial demand for using Morisawa typefaces on Windows, the company also sold ATM fonts for Windows under the name View Fonts. These were dedicated screen fonts used with the company's printer CID fonts. However, because their outline sampling quality was intentionally reduced, printing them on non-PostScript printers resulted in low-density output. They also had limited compatibility with Macintosh PostScript fonts because of differences in character sets and Latin numeral glyphs.

The company subsequently discontinued View Fonts and transitioned to OpenType, which incorporated the functions of the earlier products while eliminating these limitations.

In response to the expansion of the electronic publishing market and the spread of smart devices, Morisawa also entered fields including authoring tools for electronic books, electronic distribution of print data, and multilingual distribution using multilingual fonts.

=== Development of PostScript fonts ===
Japanese PostScript fonts were initially sold in OCF format. Because OCF fonts were structured by combining numerous one-byte Latin PostScript fonts, they presented problems such as heavy processing requirements. Morisawa later released fonts in CID format, which simplified the structure and improved performance.

However, Morisawa's CID fonts used the same PostScript names as its OCF fonts. This caused various problems when older and newer fonts were installed together. Morisawa recommended paid upgrades on the grounds that replacing all OCF fonts installed by users with CID fonts would resolve the problem, but migration was slow.

To address these issues, Morisawa released a revised format known as New-CID fonts. These fonts were distinguished from OCF fonts by adding "A-CID" to the beginning of their names, allowing the two formats to coexist. They also introduced improvements such as the ability to extract outlines.

As a result, Morisawa's PostScript fonts existed in three forms: OCF, CID (old CID), and New-CID. Depending on the version of Adobe Illustrator, it was not always possible to distinguish between the different formats when multiple versions were used simultaneously. In addition, Morisawa made corrections to outline-data bugs and changes to glyph shapes, including changes to typeforms and minor adjustments to individual elements, when releasing each product. Consequently, the compatibility of the different versions was not completely identical.

=== Mergers and collaborations ===
In April 2010, Morisawa made TypeBank a subsidiary; TypeBank was absorbed into Morisawa on September 1, 2017. In October 2011, Morisawa acquired the font business of Ryobi Imagic. On September 30, 2013, it made Rim Corporation a subsidiary, and in March 2019 it made Jiyu-Kobo a subsidiary. The company has consequently become increasingly active in mergers and acquisitions within the industry.

On January 18, 2021, Morisawa and Sha-Ken reached an agreement to jointly develop OpenType fonts. The fonts were scheduled for phased release beginning in 2024, the centenary of the joint application for a patent for Japanese phototypesetting technology by Shigekichi Ishii and Nobuo Morisawa.

== Current font products and licensing ==
=== Packages ===
MORISAWA Font Select Pack (1 / 3 / 5) / PLUS
The numbers 1, 3, and 5 indicate the number of licenses. Users can select and install the corresponding number of Morisawa's Japanese comprehensive typefaces.
PLUS is a package specifically for kana, Latin, numeral, and symbol typefaces and provides five licenses.

MORISAWA Font OpenType Basic 7 Typeface Pack
The package contains Ryumin L-KL, Futo Min A101, Midashi Min MA31, Chugothic BBB, Futo Go B101, Midashi Go MB31, and Jun 101. Its character set conforms to Adobe-Japan1-4 (Pro).

A wide variety of other packaged fonts were previously offered, but all have since been discontinued and are no longer supported.

=== Annual licenses ===
MORISAWA PASSPORT
Launched in 2005, MORISAWA PASSPORT was an annual subscription font licensing service offering access to a broad range of Morisawa typefaces. Over time, the service also incorporated typefaces from companies acquired by Morisawa, including selected TypeBank typefaces and typefaces from Jiyu-Kobo.

Morisawa began phasing out MORISAWA PASSPORT in favor of its successor subscription service, Morisawa Fonts. New typefaces have not been added to the general MORISAWA PASSPORT service since 2024, and the service is scheduled to end on December 31, 2029.

The MORISAWA PASSPORT Academic Edition was discontinued for new sales on October 1, 2024, although existing contracts remain usable until their expiration dates.

=== Major Japanese typefaces by Morisawa ===
- Ryumin
- Reimin
- Futo Min A101
- Midashi Min MA1
- Midashi Min MA31
- Shuei Mincho
- Shuei Shogo Mincho
- Toppan Bunkyu Mincho
- Toppan Bunkyu Midashi Mincho
- Kocho
- A1 Mincho
- Kizahashi Kinryo
- Shimanami
- Shin Go
- Gothic MB101
- A1 Gothic
- Chugothic BBB
- Futo Go B101
- Midashi Go MB1
- Midashi Go MB31
- Shuei Kakugothic Kin
- Shuei Kakugothic Gin
- Toppan Bunkyu Gothic
- Toppan Bunkyu Midashi Gothic
- Kuretake Meiseki
- Jun
- Shin Maru Go
- Soft Gothic
- Shuei Maru Gothic
- Folk
- Maru Folk
- Kakumin
- Kai Min
- Hase Min
- Moaria
- Cinema Letter
- Talking
- Taka Hand
- Taka Rhythm
- Taka Pokki
- Taka Modern
- Take
- Tunnel
- Akashi
- Jomyo
- Kamome Ryuso
- Michikusa
- Nakin
- Musashino
- Kumoyaji
- Harucraft
- Pretty Momo
- Penpal
- Haruhi Gakuen
- Suzumushi
- Utayomi
- Hase Fude
- Kokuyō
- Kensen
- Kotoh
- Seikaisho CB1
- Shin Seikaisho CBSK1
- Ōtai Kaisho
- Kaisho MCBK1
- Sakuragi Keisetsu
- Kyokasho ICA
- Kaku Shingyosho
- Kinrei Gyosho
- Reisho E1
- Reisho 101
- Riku Rei
- Kanteiryū
- Hige Moji
- M News M
- M News G
- Mainichi Shimbun Mincho
- Mainichi Shimbun Gothic
- Shuei 3
- Shuei 5
- Shuei 4 Kana
- Shuei 4 Futo Kana
- Shuei Antique
- Antique AN
- Neo Tsudei
- Happy N
- Wanpaku Gothic N
- TypeLabo N
- Hase Toppo
- Bokuto N
- Zengo N
- Maru Tsudei
- Maru Antique
- Camo Lemon
- Camo Lime
- Cappy N
- Lalapop
- Honami

=== Korean typefaces ===
- Chūminchō HAB1
- Chūminchō HAB31
- Futo Gothic HA1
- Futo Gothic HA101
- Katsuji-tai HA301
- Midashi Min HMA1
- Midashi Min HMA31
- Hoso Gothic HBC501
- Gothic HBC1
- Chūgothic HBB1
- Futo Gothic HB1
- Midashi Gothic HMB1
- Midashi Gothic HMB31
- Fango-dic HBDB1

== Major phototypesetting typefaces ==
Weights are ordered "light / → / bold ( / → decorative)".
Nikkatsu, Iwata, and Motoya typefaces are not included.

- Hoso Mincho AC1
- Chū Mincho ABB1
- Chū Mincho Kana ABB1001
- Futo Mincho Kana A31
- TV Futo Mincho TA1
- Midashi Mincho Kana MA131
- Linea
- Futo Antique HF10
- Minyusha Kana typeface (Mincho and Gothic styles)
- MO-GAN
- Arrow 4
- Miyake Arrow
- Arrow M (plain / line / line shadow)
- Shin Shimbun Mincho A1
- Shin Shimbun Mincho A101
- Shin Shimbun Mincho A201
- Hoso Gothic BC501
- Hoso Gothic BC31
- Futo Gothic B1
- TV Futo Gothic BT1
- Jun Gothic No. 1 / 2 / 3 / 4
- Tsudei (comprehensive typeface) L / R / M / B
- Arrow G 5 / plain / special / line / line shadow
- Chū Maru Gothic BDB1
- Futo Maru Gothic BD1
- Futo Maru Gothic BD101
- Midashi Maru Gothic MBD31
- Midashi Maru Gothic MBD101
- Midashimaru Gothic MBD501
- Jun KL 101 / 201 / 34 / 501
- Jun line
- Arrow R (plain / line / line shadow / stencil)
- Shin Seikaisho Kana CBSK31
- Kaisho CBR1
- Gyōsho 1
- Gyōsho 101
- Wakamatsu Gyōsho (light / bold)
- Wakamatsu Reisho
- Chūin Tensho
- Koin-tai
- Comars L
- Flight
- Talk
- OH No. 1 / 2 / 3 / 4
- Arrow Ace M1 / 3
- Kida Kana
- Big

== Major phototypesetting, computerized phototypesetting, and typesetting systems ==
(Partial list)

- MC-1
- MC-2
- MD
- MD-T (for television captions)
- MC-6
- MC-58
- ROBO15XY
- ROBO-STATION
- MC-2001
- MC-100
- MC-P
- Rhinotron
- MK-110
- MK-300
- MK-300P
- MK-500
- MK-700
- RISAWORD
- MC-B2
- MVP
- MC-Smart

== Publications and related works ==
- 沢田玩治 (Ganji Sawada), 『写植に生きる森澤信夫』 (Shashoku ni ikiru Morisawa Nobuo), "Living with Phototypesetting: Nobuo Morisawa", Morisawa, 2000.
- 藤田栄一 (Eiichi Fujita), ed., 『写植に生き、文字に生き : 森澤親子二代の挑戦』 (Shashoku ni iki, moji ni iki: Morisawa oyako nidai no chōsen), "Living with Phototypesetting, Living with Characters: The Challenge of Two Generations of the Morisawa Family", Venture Communications, 1999.
- 馬渡力 (Tsutomu Mawatari), 『写真植字機五十年』 (Shashin shokujiki gojūnen), "Fifty Years of Phototypesetting Machines", Morisawa, 1974.
- 森澤信夫 (Nobuo Morisawa), 『写真植字機とともに三十八年』 (Shashin shokujiki to tomo ni sanjūhachi-nen), "Thirty-Eight Years with Phototypesetting Machines", Morisawa Photo Typesetting Machine Manufacturing Co., 1960.
- たて組ヨコ組 (Tate-gumi Yoko-gumi) - a quarterly corporate magazine published from 1983 to 2002.
- 人間と文字 (Ningen to moji) - a CD-ROM released in 1999 and later discontinued. It presents the history of more than 200 writing systems through different regions and periods, using extensive illustrations and video, and was designed as an interactive introduction to the study of writing systems.
- フォント男子！ (Font Danshi!) - a manga anthropomorphizing fonts, produced with the cooperation of Morisawa.

== Tokyo 2020 official supporter ==
In December 2018, Morisawa announced that it had signed an official sponsorship agreement for the Tokyo 2020 Olympic and Paralympic Games. In February 2019, it was announced as the developer of the official Tokyo 2020 font.

Morisawa has also supported para-sports, including sponsorship of the Japanese Para-Sports Association and the Japan Wheelchair Basketball Federation since 2015. For example, wheelchair racer Tomoki Sato has a professional contract with Morisawa.
