= Linotype =

Linotype may refer to:

- Linotype machine, a typesetting machine, once commonly used for newspapers
- Mergenthaler Linotype Company (later, Linotype GmbH), a type foundry that produced the first linotype machines
- Linotype (alloy), a group of lead alloys, used in linotype machines
