= Blended-metal bullets =

The US Navy defines blended-metal bullets as, "projectiles which utilize cores manufactured with materials other than lead, using processes other than melting." The solicitation elaborates as follows:

The base metals used in these formulations are usually a very fine powder. Copper, tungsten, and brass are examples of some of the base powdered metals used to date. These powdered metals are mixed with a binder such as tin, zinc, or a polymer such as nylon. Once the powdered metal(s) and binder(s) are mixed, they are pressed or molded into the final projectile core form, and in some cases sintered.

Blended-metal rounds are commercially available at this time in limited quantities from independent dealers in a variety of calibers, and sintered non-lead bullets have been available for handloading since at least 2006.

== RBCD Performance Plus, Inc. ==
One now-defunct company, RBCD Performance Plus, Inc. of San Antonio, Texas, produced ammunition marketed as blended-metal bullets. However, RBCD's "Blended-Metal Technology" (BMT) was a trademark and not a description of bullet composition. Independent testing by Gary Roberts showed that RBCD ammunition was, "nothing but lightweight, repackaged varmint bullets disguised with a black coating of moly, and driven to higher than normal velocities with concomitantly higher than normal pressures." Roberts cites a USSOCOM and ARDEC study published in 2007 which supports his findings.
