= Plastic-tipped bullet =

Hollow-point bullet tipped with a polymer nose cone

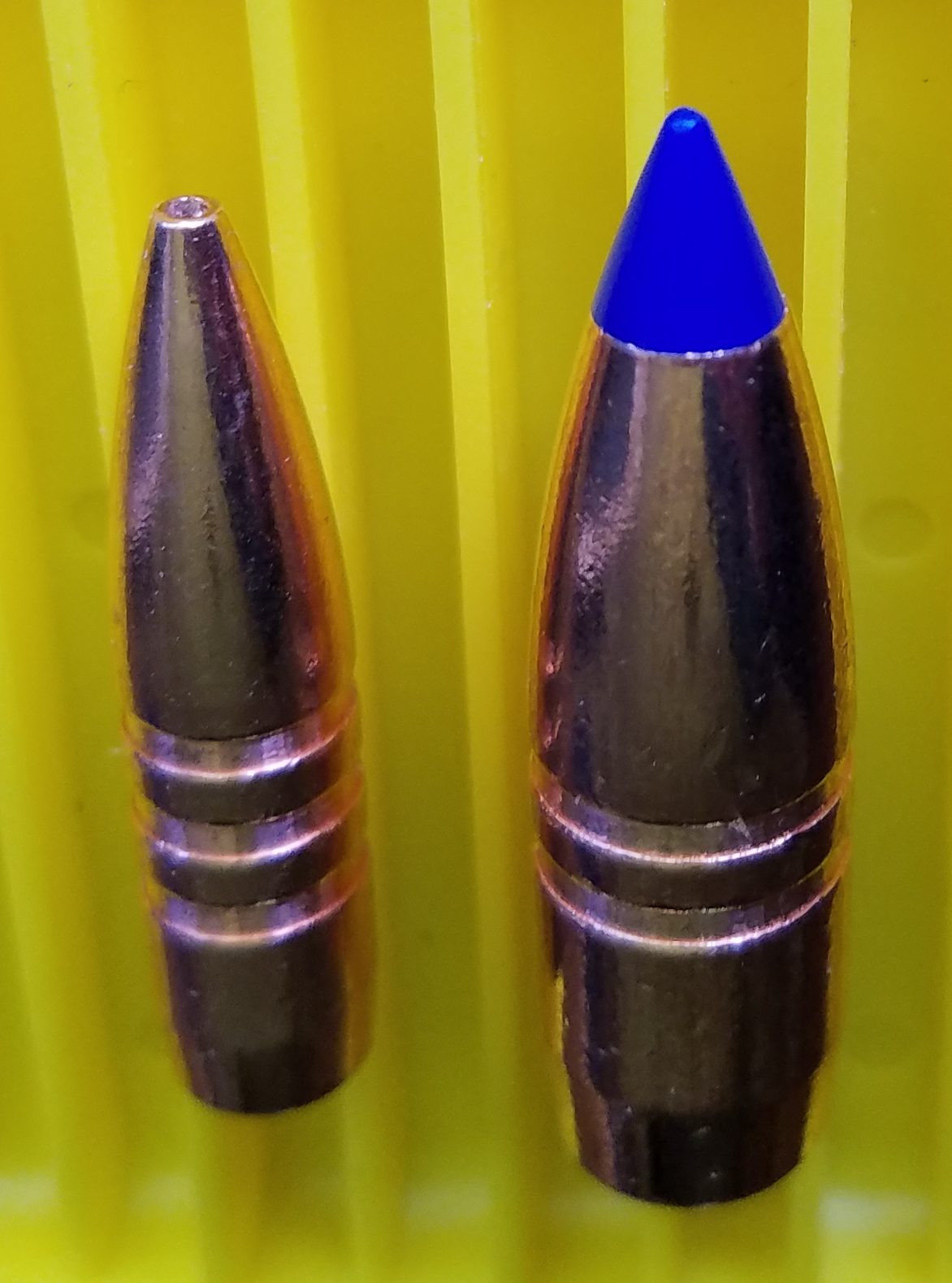
Green bullets of solid copper may use a plastic tip to preserve aerodynamic shape while enlarging the hollow point to improve expansion.

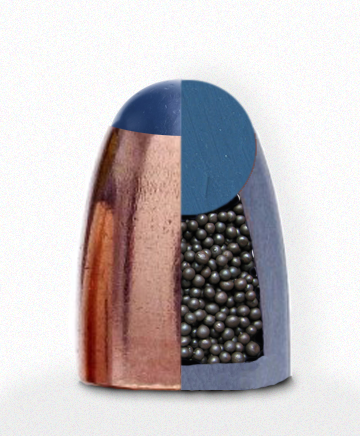
Artist's conception of the inside of the Glaser Safety Slug.

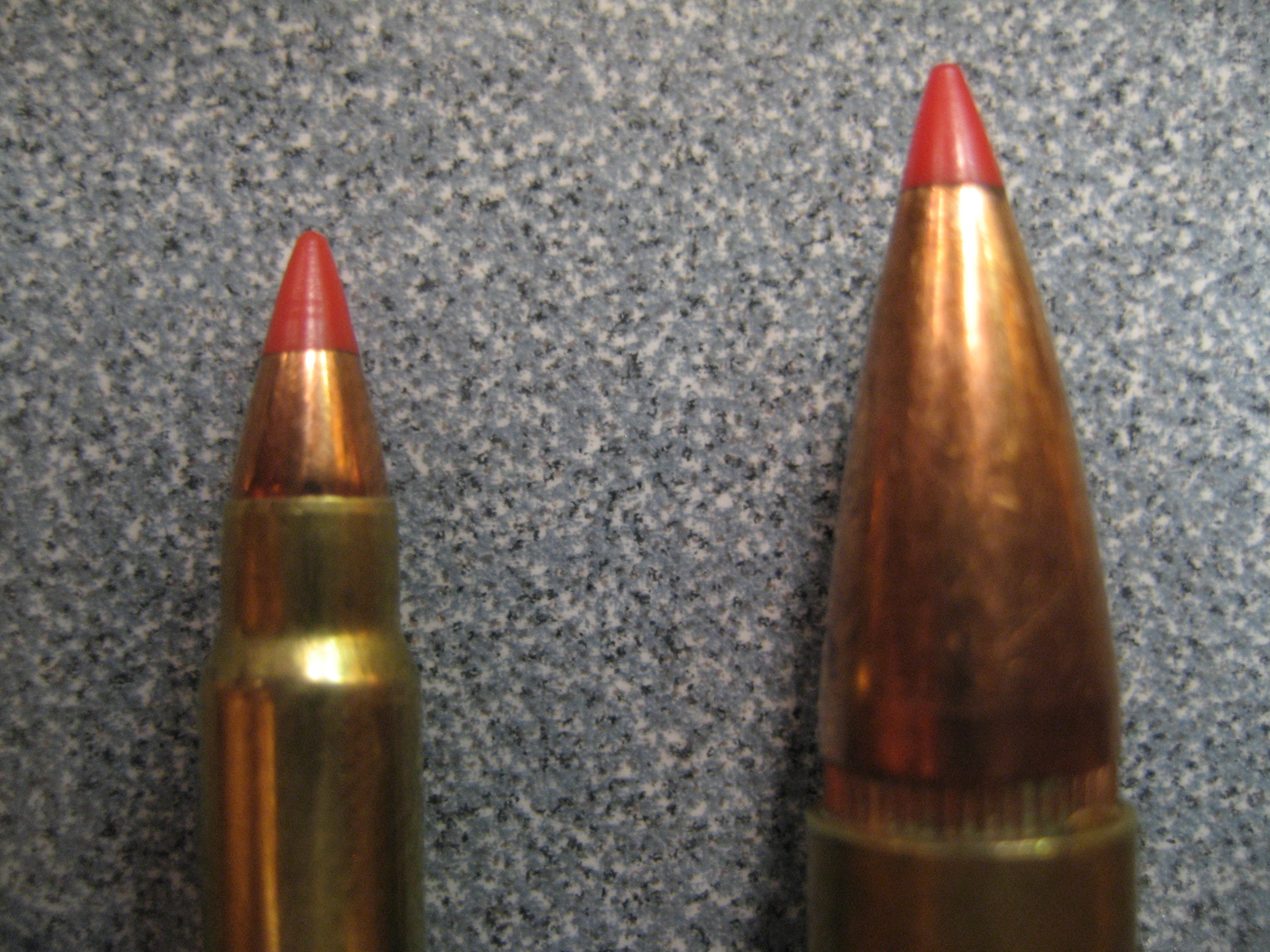
Ballistic Tips: Hornady 17 gr. V-Max 17HMR, .308 Winchester

A plastic-tipped bullet is a type of hollow-point bullet tipped with a nose cone made of synthetic polymer to give it a pointed spitzer-like shape.

The plastic tip drives into the hollow point upon impact, causing the bullet to expand, which increases lethality. These bullets are typically designed for rifles and single-shot handguns, improving aerodynamics for longer, more accurate flights. Some companies also produce such bullets for semi-automatic pistols to improve ammunition feeding and prevent jams. The term "Ballistic Tip" is trademarked by Nosler, with other companies like Hornady and Sierra Bullets also producing similar bullets.

== Design and use ==
The bullets consist of a fairly normal hollow-point bullet with the frontal cavity filled in by hard plastic, which is molded into a streamlined shape. Most tips are made of polyoxymethylene, although some manufacturers have used polyester urethane-methylenebis(phenylisocyanate) copolymer.

Upon impact, the plastic drives into the hollow point and the bullet performs like a standard hollow-point, expanding ("mushrooming") to a larger diameter. These bullets possess the aerodynamics for longer, more accurate flights, and the in-target performance to ensure high lethality.

Traditionally, these bullets are intended for use in rifles and single-shot handguns, as pistols are not normally used at the great distances where the streamlined ballistic tip is advantageous. However, a few companies produce pistol ammunition with plastic-tipped hollow points where the plastic is molded into a more rounded tip. These designs are not created to increase the streamlining of the bullet but rather to improve ammunition feeding in semi-automatic pistols that are prone to jams with standard hollow point ammunition. Examples of such pistol ammunition include Cor-Bon/Glaser’s "Glaser Pow'RBall" line and Extreme Shock's "NyTrilium Air Freedom" ammunition (the "NyTrilium Air Freedom" cartridge also mimics the performance of Glaser Safety Slug cartridges, as it uses hollow bullets full of powdered metal designed to fragment rapidly on hitting a target).

"Ballistic Tip" is a registered trademark of Nosler, but numerous other companies produce similar projectiles, including Hornady and Sierra. Nosler uses a color code to indicate caliber on the polymer bullet tips, to make them easily distinguishable from each other: .224 orange,.257-blue, 6mm-purple, 6.5mm-tan, .270-yellow, 7mm-red, .30-green, .338-maroon and 8mm-dark blue.

== Examples ==
Notable examples include:

- .17 HMR
- .204 Ruger
- FN 5.7×28mm
- .30-30 Winchester
- .308 Winchester
- .460 S&W Magnum

== See also ==
- APCBC
