= Linotype (alloy) =

Linotype or eutectic alloy is a broad name applied to five categories of lead alloys used in manufacture of type, especially for the Linotype machine, each with three to five sub-classifications.

One alloy is composed of lead with 4% tin and 12% antimony.
