= Terminal ballistics =

Projectiles' behavior after reaching their targets

Bullet parts: 1 metal jacket, 2 lead core, 3 steel penetrator

Terminal ballistics is a sub-field of ballistics concerned with the behavior and effects of a projectile when it hits and transfers its energy to a target. This field is usually cited in forensic ballistics.

Bullet design (as well as the velocity of impact) largely determines the effectiveness of penetration.

== General ==
The concept of terminal ballistics can be applied to any projectile striking a target. Much of the topic specifically regards the effects of small arms fire striking live targets, and a projectile's ability to incapacitate or eliminate a target.

Common factors include bullet mass, composition, velocity, and shape.

== Firearm projectiles ==
=== Class of projectile ===
Projectiles are primarily designed for compatibility with the constraints of the device used to launch them, and secondarily according to some balance of logistical practicality, practicable accuracy, and terminal effect. Prior to the development of rifling, the majority of projectiles purpose-built for shooting consisted of fitted round balls, or multi-projectile shot loads. In modern times, this approach to shooting persists, as well as other means which have been refined within unique settings over centuries. In addition to advances of barrel design, the means of propulsion available have also diversified, including guns designed to use black powder, smokeless powder, compressed air, and electromagnetic force.

Ammunition, and the components thereof, can be categorized in an assortment of fashions. Among other ways, it may be approached according to the shape, the mass, the dimensions of a projectile or cartridge, the customary charge of powder, velocity, intended purpose, and recommended applications. Though some projectiles and ammunition are designed from the beginning for the sole purpose of target shooting, the minimal powder charges necessary to force a metal projectile down the length of a barrel may be potentially lethal, and should be treated as such.

Conventional forms of projectiles:

- Round ball - Spherical in shape prior to loading, used in smooth or rifled barrels
- Shot - Multi-projectile load, typically spherical or semi-spherical, best used in smoothbores
- Slug - A nose heavy design that uses air drag from a light hollowed base or wad to aid stability
- Pellet - (Specific) A self sealing, non-spherical projectile, typically designed to obturate with a rear skirt
- Bullet - (Specific) A semi-cylindrical projectile, often with a frontal nose, stabilized gyroscopically from rotation

==== Target shooting ====
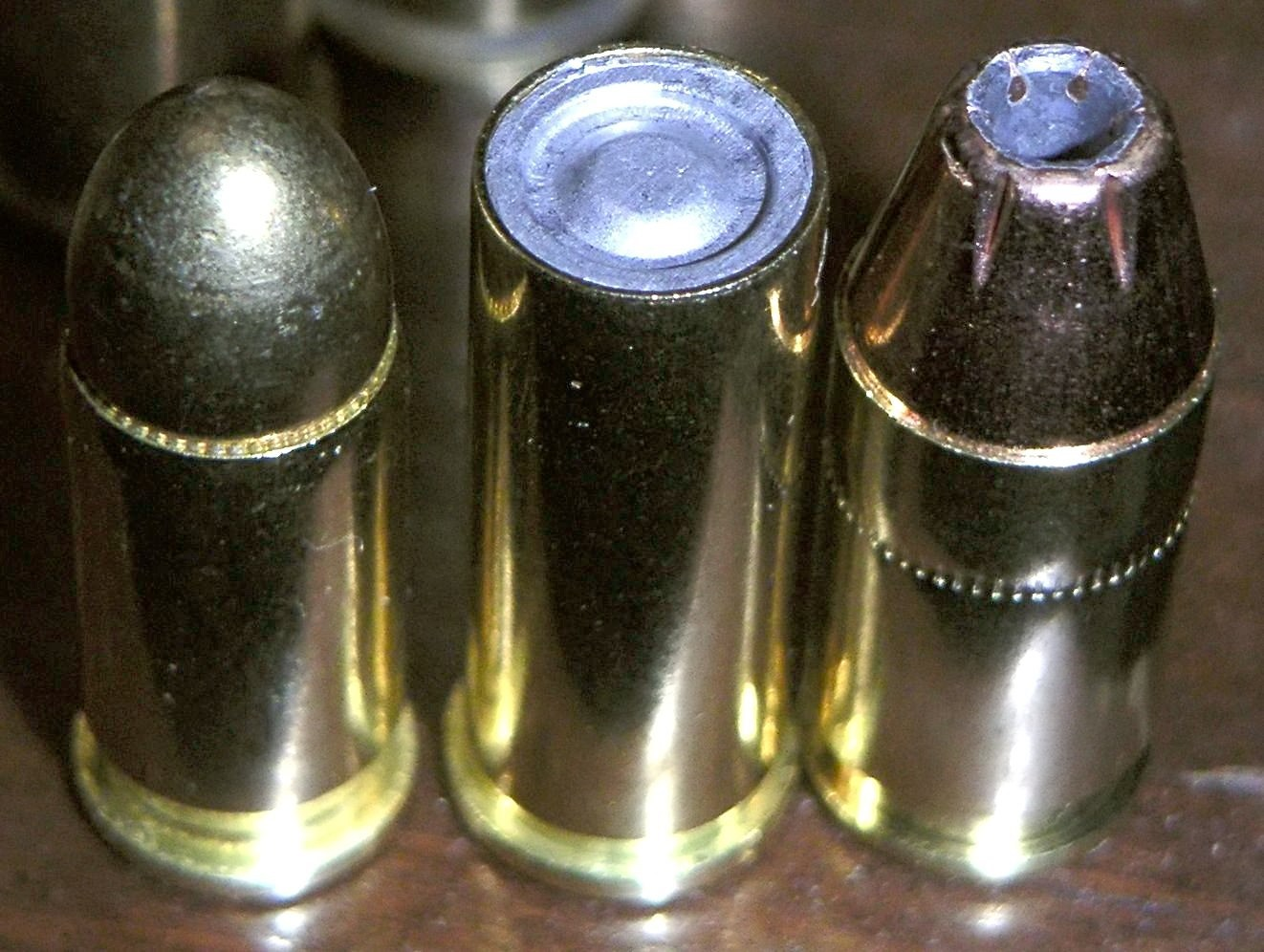
.32 ACP full metal jacket, .32 S&W Long wadcutter, .380 ACP jacketed hollow point

For short-range target shooting, typically on ranges up to 50 meters, or 55 yards, with low-powered ammunition like .22 long rifle, aerodynamics is relatively unimportant, and velocities are low compared to velocities attained by full-powered ammunition.

As long as a bullet's mass is balanced, it will not tumble; its shape is thus unimportant for purposes of its aerodynamics. For shooting at paper targets, bullets that will punch a perfect hole through the target —called wadcutters— are preferred. They have a very flat front, often with a relatively sharp edge along the perimeter, which punches out a hole equal to or almost equal to its diameter, thus enabling unambiguous scoring of the target. Since cutting the edge of a target ring will result in a higher score, accuracy to within fractions of an inch is desirable.

Magazine-fed pistols tend not to reliably feed wadcutters because of their angular shape. To address this, the semi-wadcutter is often used. The semi-wadcutter consists of a conical section that comes to a smaller flat point and a thin sharp shoulder at the base of the cone. The flat point punches a hole, and the shoulder opens it up cleanly. For steel targets, the concern is to provide enough force to knock over the target while minimizing the damage to the target. A soft lead bullet, or jacketed hollow-point bullet, or soft-point bullet will flatten out on impact (if the velocity at impact is sufficient to make it deform), spreading the impact over a larger area of the target, allowing more total force to be applied without damaging the steel target.

There are also specialized bullets designed for use in long-range precision target shooting with high-powered rifles. The designs vary somewhat from manufacturer to manufacturer. Research in the 1950s by the U.S. Air Force discovered that bullets are more stable in flight for longer distances and more resistant to crosswinds if the center of gravity is biased to the rear of the center of pressure. The MatchKing bullet is an open-tip match design with a tiny aperture in the jacket at the point of the bullet and a hollow air space under the point of the bullet, whereas previous conventional bullets had a lead core that went all the way up to the point.

The U.S. military now issues ammunition to snipers that use bullets of this type. M852 Match and M118LR ammunition are issued for the 7.62×51mm chamber: both use Sierra MatchKing bullets; for 5.56×45mm those U.S. Navy and U.S. Marine snipers who use accurized M16-type rifles are issued the Mk 262 Mod 0 cartridge developed jointly by Black Hills Ammunition and Crane Naval Surface Warfare Center.

For ultra-long-range precision target shooting with high-powered rifles and military sniping, radically designed very-low-drag (VLD) bullets are available that are generally produced out of rods of mono-metal alloys on CNC lathes. The driving force behind these projectiles is the wish to enhance the practical maximum effective range beyond normal standards. To achieve this, the bullets have to be very long and normal cartridge overall lengths often have to be exceeded. Common rifling twist rates also often have to be tightened to stabilize very long projectiles. Such commercially nonexistent cartridges are termed "wildcats". The use of a wildcat-based (ultra) long-range cartridge demands the use of a custom or customized rifle with an appropriately cut chamber and a fast-twist bore.

==== Maximum penetration ====
For use against armored targets, or large, tough game animals, penetration is the most important consideration. Focusing the largest amount of kinetic energy and projectile mass on the smallest possible area of the target provides the greatest penetration. Bullets for maximum penetration are designed to resist deformation on impact and usually are made of lead that is covered in a copper, brass, or mild steel jacket (some are even solid copper or bronze alloy). The jacket completely covers the front of the bullet, although often the rear is left with exposed lead (this is a manufacturing consideration: the jacket is formed first, and the lead is swaged in from the rear).

For penetrating substances significantly harder than jacketed lead, the lead core is supplemented with or replaced with a harder material, such as hardened steel. Military armor-piercing small arms ammunition is made from a copper-jacketed steel core; the steel resists deformation better than the usual soft lead core leading to greater penetration. The current NATO 5.56mm SS109 (M855) bullet uses a steel-tipped lead core to improve penetration, the steel tip providing resistance to deformation for armor piercing, and the heavier lead core (25% heavier than the previous bullet, the M193) providing increased sectional density for better penetration in soft targets. For larger, higher-velocity calibers, such as tank guns, hardness is of secondary importance to density, and are normally sub-caliber projectiles made from tungsten carbide, tungsten hard alloy, or depleted uranium fired in a light aluminum or magnesium alloy (or carbon fiber in some cases) sabot.

Many modern tank guns are smoothbore, not rifled because practical rifling twists can only stabilize projectiles, such as an armor-piercing, capped, ballistic cap, with a length-to-diameter ratio of up to about 5:1 and also because the rifling adds friction, reducing the velocity and thus total force it is possible to achieve. To get the maximum force on the smallest area, modern anti-tank rounds have aspect ratios of 10:1 or more. Since these cannot be stabilized by rifling, they are built instead like large darts, with fins providing the stabilizing force instead of rifling. These subcaliber rounds, called armor-piercing fin-stabilized discarding sabot are held in place in the bore by sabots. The sabot is a light material that transfers the pressure of the charge to the penetrator, then is discarded when the round leaves the barrel.

==== Controlled penetration ====
The final category of bullets is that intended to control penetration so as not to harm anything behind the target. Such bullets are used primarily for hunting and civilian antipersonnel use; they are not generally used by the military, since the use of expanding bullets in international conflicts is prohibited by the Hague Convention and because these bullets have less chance of penetrating modern body armor. These bullets are designed to increase their surface area on impact, thus creating greater drag and limiting the travel through the target. A desirable side effect is that the expanded bullet makes a larger hole, increasing tissue damage and speeding up incapacitation.

While a bullet that penetrates through-and-through tends to cause more profuse bleeding, allowing a game animal to be blood trailed more easily, in some applications, preventing exit from the rear of the target is more desirable. A perforating bullet can continue on (likely not coaxial to the original trajectory due to target deflection) and might cause unintended damage or injury.

===== Flat point =====
One of the simpler ways to find consistent disruption from a bullet is forming a wide and flat tip. This increases the effective surface area, as rounded bullets can allow tissues to "flow" around the edges. Flat points also increase drag during flight to various extent, which along with the type of material and muzzle velocity, tends to affect the degree of expansion at impact.

Flat-point bullets, with especially pronounced fronts of up to 90% of the overall bullet diameter, are sometimes preferred for use against large or dangerous game animals. For such purposes, they are typically made of unusually hard alloys, and may be longer and heavier than normal for their caliber to decrease the chance of deflection, and even include exotic materials such as tungsten to increase their sectional density. These bullets are designed to penetrate with sufficient depth through muscle, bone, and vital areas while causing a wound channel ranging from bullet diameter to the size of a coin, significantly larger than the bullet, and are most likely to perform similarly at any angle and at various ranges. One of the hunting applications of the flat point bullet is large game such as bear hunting, in which case people may be carrying a sidearm such as a .44 Magnum, 10 mm, or a larger caliber that is not intensively reliant on expansion.

Light weight non-expanding projectiles pushed at a relatively high speed are also utilized, generally for close ranged applications well inside 100 yards. The light for caliber bullets will transfer energy to a given medium more rapidly, yet with consistent penetration characteristics relative to their sectional density and a constant tapering effect as the bullet graduates to a stop. Such implementations may be conducive to mitigating fragmentation where weight retention is prioritized.

Other flat pointed bullets offer expansion ranging up into 1 to 3 times the original diameter of the bullet. Such ammunition is typically made from lead or with a supporting metal jacket design, which may contain pure lead, or a lead alloy which is strengthened in proportion to the expected range of velocities at impact. Particularly soft forms of lead may expand well at longer ranges, but must be kept at a velocity that is within reason for a close ranged shot. More resilient lead alloys which retain malleability will exhibit exceptional mass retention when pushed to a respective velocity and promptly strike hard surfaces at close range, but may have limited expansion characteristics at longer range. Ideally, the reduction in expansion will be proportionate to the reduction in energy over distance. Therefore, with equal or greater mass retention, the bullet proves to exhibit a higher sectional density necessary for sufficient penetration throughout its intended range.

In the real world, where people make some occasional mistakes in judgement, flat pointed bullets can have some forgiving advantages. Bullets fail in a variety of ways. While flat pointed bullets are not immune to deflection or severe fragmentation off hard surfaces, they do tend to be resistant, and any tendency to bleed off a small amount of speed only helps to mitigate misjudgments pertaining to metallurgy, particularly if the design coincides with additional weight. Secondly, when bullets fail to expand as expected, such as an impact on game 50 or 100 yards beyond what the ammunition is designed for, a bullet with a wide enough flat point (meplat) will never "pencil through" with minimal disruption in the absence of tumbling. A properly proportioned flat pointed bullet can most assuredly leave a hole of sufficient diameter through the vital area, which is all that is necessary to end an animal's struggle with a difference of time appropriately measured in seconds from that of a higher velocity impact.

===== Expanding =====
More effective on lighter targets are expanding bullets, the hollow-point bullet, and the soft-point bullet. These are designed to use the hydraulic pressure of muscle tissue to expand the bullet. The hollow point peels back into several connected pieces (sometimes referred to as petals due to their appearance) causing the bullet to create a larger area of permanent damage. The hollow point fills with body tissue and fluids on impact, then expands as the bullet continues to have matter pushed into it. This process is informally called mushrooming, as the ideal result is a shape that resembles a mushroom—a cylindrical base, topped with a wide surface where the tip of the bullet has peeled back to expose more area while traveling through a body. For the purposes of aerodynamic efficiency, due to the hollow-point not creating drag, the tip of the hollow-point will often be tipped with a pointed polymer 'nose' which may also aid in expansion by functioning as a piston upon impact pushing the hollow point open. A copper-plated hollow-point loaded in a .44 Magnum, for example, with an original weight of 240 grains (15.55 g) and a diameter of 0.43 inch (11 mm) might mushroom on impact to form a rough circle with a diameter of 0.70 inches (18 mm) and a final weight of 239 grains (15.48 g). This is excellent performance; almost the entire weight is retained, and the frontal surface area increased by 63%. Penetration of the hollow-point would be less than half that of a similar nonexpanding bullet, and the resulting wound or permanent cavity would be much wider.

It might seem that if the whole purpose of a maximum disruption round is to expand to a larger diameter, it would make more sense to start out with the desired diameter rather than relying on the somewhat inconsistent results of expansion on impact. While there is merit to this (there is a strong following of the .45 ACP, as compared to the .40 S&W and 0.355 in diameter 9×19mm, for just this reason) there are also significant downsides. A larger-diameter bullet is going to have significantly more drag than a smaller-diameter bullet of the same mass, which means long-range performance will be significantly degraded. A larger diameter bullet also means more space is required to store the ammunition, which means either bulkier guns or smaller magazine capacities. The common trade-off when comparing .45 ACP, .40 S&W, and 9×19mm pistols is a 7- to 14-round capacity in the .45 ACP versus a 10- to 16-round capacity in the .40 S&W versus a 13- to 19-round capacity in the 9×19mm. Although several .45-caliber pistols are available with high-capacity magazines (Para Ordnance being one of the first in the late 1980s) many people find the wide grip required uncomfortable and difficult to use. Especially where the military requirement of a nonexpanding round is concerned, there is fierce debate over whether it is better to have fewer, larger bullets for enhanced terminal effects, or more, smaller bullets for an increased number of potential target hits.

===== Fragmenting =====
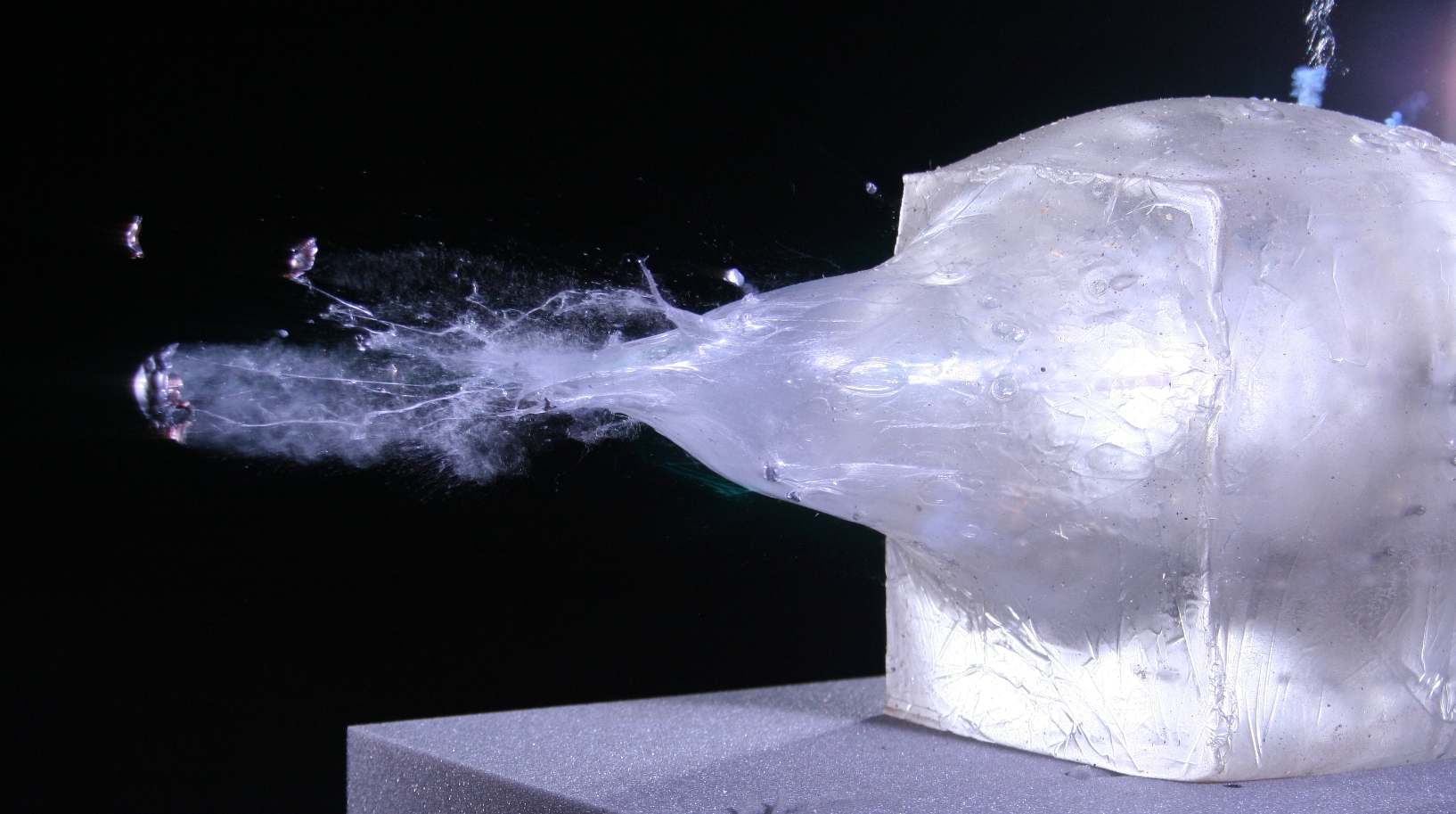
Example photo of the over-penetration of a fragmenting projectile

This class of projectile is designed to break apart on impact whilst being of a construction more akin to that of an expanding bullet. Fragmenting bullets are usually constructed like the hollow-point projectiles described above, but with deeper and larger cavities. They may also have thinner copper jackets in order to reduce their overall integrity. These bullets are typically fired at high velocities to maximize their fragmentation upon impact. In contrast to a hollow-point which attempts to stay in one large piece retaining as much weight as possible whilst presenting the most surface area to the target, a fragmenting bullet is intended to break up into many small pieces almost instantly.

This means that all the kinetic energy from the bullet is transferred to the target in a very short period of time. The most common application of this bullet is the shooting of vermin, such as prairie dogs. The effect of these bullets is quite dramatic, often resulting in the animal being blown apart upon impact. However, in larger games fragmenting ammunition provides inadequate penetration of vital organs to ensure a clean kill; instead, a "splash wound" may result. This also limits the practical use of these rounds to supersonic (rifle) rounds, which have a high enough kinetic energy to ensure a lethal hit. The two main advantages of this ammunition are that it is very humane, as a hit almost anywhere on most small vermin will ensure an instant kill, and that the relatively low mass bullet fragments pose a very low risk of ricochet or of penetrating unintended secondary targets. Fragmenting bullets should not be confused with frangible bullets (see below).

Also used are bullets similar to hollow-point bullets or soft-point bullets whose cores and/or jackets are deliberately weakened to cause deformation or fragmentation upon impact. The Warsaw Pact 5.45×39mm M74 assault rifle round exemplifies a trend that is becoming common in the era of high velocity, small caliber military rounds. The 5.45×39mm uses a steel-jacketed bullet with a two-part core, the rear being lead and the front being steel with an air pocket foremost. Upon impact, the unsupported tip deforms, bending the bullet nose into a slight "L" shape. This causes the bullet to tumble in the tissue, thus increasing its effective frontal surface area by traveling sideways more often than not.

This does not violate the Hague Convention, as it specifically mentions bullets that expand or flatten in the body. The NATO SS109 also tends to bend at the steel/lead junction, but with its weaker jacket, it fragments into many dozens of pieces. NATO 7.62 mm balls manufactured by some countries, such as Germany and Sweden, are also known to fragment due to jacket construction.

===== Frangible =====
The last category of expanding bullets is frangible bullets. These are designed to break upon impact, which results in a huge increase in surface area. The most common of these bullets are made of small diameter lead pellets, placed in a thin copper shell, and held in place by an epoxy or similar binding agent. On impact, the epoxy shatters, and the copper shell opens up, the individual lead balls then spread out in a wide pattern, and due to their low mass-to-surface area ratio, stop very quickly. Similar bullets are made out of sintered metals, which turn to powder upon impact. These bullets are usually restricted to pistol cartridges and rifle cartridges intended for use at very short ranges, as the nonhomogeneous cores tend to cause inaccuracies that, while acceptable at short ranges, are not acceptable for the long ranges at which some rifles are used.

By far the most common use of frangible ammunition is for training by shooting steel targets at close ranges, while one may be at risk of being injured by fragments of standard solid lead bullets at close ranges when shooting steel, the powder that frangible bullets disintegrate into upon impact poses a very low risk to the shooter. This becomes irrelevant when shooting at longer ranges because it is unlikely that fragments created by the impact of any type of bullet on a steel target will travel more than 50-100yds, in these long-range cases it is of more value to use bullets that fly identically to those to be used in real situations than to mitigate the possible risks of bullet fragments and ricochets so frangible bullets are typically not used. One interesting use of the sintered metal rounds is in shotguns in hostage rescue situations; the sintered metal round is used at near-contact range to shoot the lock mechanism out of doors. The resulting metal powder will immediately disperse after knocking out the door lock and cause little or no damage to the occupants of the room. Frangible rounds are also used by armed security agents on aircraft. The concern is not depressurization (a bullet hole will not depressurize an airliner), but over-penetration and damage to vital electrical or hydraulic lines, or injury to an innocent bystander by a bullet that travels through a target's body completely instead of stopping in the body.

=== Large caliber ===
The purpose of firing a large caliber projectile is not always the same. For example, one might need to create disorganization within enemy troops, create casualties within enemy troops, eliminate the functioning of an enemy tank, or destroy an enemy bunker. Different purposes of course require different projectile designs.

Many large caliber projectiles are filled with a high explosive which, when detonated, shatters the shell casing, producing thousands of high-velocity fragments and an accompanying sharply rising blast overpressure. More rarely, others are used to release chemical or biological agents, either on impact or when over the target area; designing an appropriate fuse is a difficult task that lies outside the realm of terminal ballistics.

Other large-caliber projectiles use bomblets (sub-munitions), which are released by the carrier projectile at a required height or time above their target. For US artillery ammunition, these projectiles are called Dual-Purpose Improved Conventional Munition (DPICM), a 155 mm M864 DPICM projectile for example contains a total of 72 shaped-charge fragmentation bomblets. The use of multiple bomblets over a single HE projectile allows for a denser and less wasteful fragmentation field to be produced. If a bomblet strikes an armored vehicle, there is also a chance that the shaped charge will (if used) penetrate and disable the vehicle. A negative factor in their use is that any bomblets that fail to function go on to litter the battlefield in a highly sensitive and lethal state, causing casualties long after the cessation of conflict. International conventions tend to forbid or restrict the use of this type of projectile.

Some anti-armor projectiles use what is known as a shaped charge to defeat their target. Shaped charges have been used ever since it was discovered that a block of high explosives with letters engraved in it created perfect impressions of those letters when detonated against a piece of metal. A shaped charge is an explosive charge with a hollow lined cavity at one end and a detonator at the other. They operate by the detonating high explosive collapsing the (often copper) liner into itself. Some of the collapsing liners go on to form a constantly stretching jet of material traveling at hypersonic speed. When detonated at the correct standoff to the armor, the jet violently forces its way through the target's armor.

Contrary to popular belief, the jet of a copper-lined shaped charge is not molten, although it is heated to about 500 °C. This misconception is due to the metal's fluid-like behavior, which is caused by the massive pressures produced during the detonation of the explosive causing the metal to flow plastically. When used in the anti-tank role, a projectile that uses a shaped-charge warhead is known by the acronym HEAT (high-explosive anti-tank).

Shaped charges can be defended against by the use of explosive reactive armor (ERA), or complex composite armor arrays. ERA uses a high explosive sandwiched between two, relatively thin, (normally) metallic plates. The explosive is detonated when struck by the shaped charge's jet, the detonating explosive sandwich forces the two plates apart, lowering the jets’ penetration by interfering with, and disrupting it. A disadvantage of using ERA is that each plate can protect against a single strike, and the resulting explosion can be extremely dangerous to nearby personnel and lightly armored structures.

Tank fired HEAT projectiles are slowly being replaced for the attack of heavy armor by so-called "kinetic energy" penetrators. It is the most primitive (in-shape) projectiles that are hardest to defend against. A KE penetrator requires an enormous thickness of steel, or a complex armor array to protect against. They also produce a much larger diameter hole in comparison to a shaped charge and hence produce a far more extensive behind armor effect. KE penetrators are most effective when constructed of a dense tough material that is formed into a long, narrow, arrow/dart like projectile.

Tungsten and depleted uranium alloys are often used as the penetrator material. The length of the penetrator is limited by the ability of the penetrator to withstand launch forces whilst in the bore and shear forces along its length at impact.

=== Limitations of materials and construction ===
==== Lead ====
Malleable lead alloy or jacketed lead core projectiles conducive to expansion have been shown to be capable of exhibiting between 98 and 100% weight retention at velocities up to 2000 feet per second, however measures approaching an ideal weight retention in practice would generally be realized at lower velocities due to inconsistencies of impacted targets in the real world. According to various experience and methodology, the limit at which expanding lead projectiles of appropriate alloy can be launched with minimal contamination upon impact may be contended more or less within the vicinity of Mach 2 speeds.

Several methods have been developed to improve performance under the stress of high velocities. Hard cast lead alloys have been utilized which are resistant to expansion and deformation of any kind. These hard cast varieties may be more brittle than softer alloys, but within their limitations are capable of exhibiting greater weight retention at velocities up to around 2500 feet per second. Whether or not they are of sufficient construction, cast lead bullets are typically not pushed at significantly higher velocities, as accuracy is subject to degrees of degradation, with relation to the type of alloy, form of the bullet, lubricants or coatings, and design of the barrel.

Bullets with an exposed lead tip which are designed to fire in excess of 2400 feet per second are typically made of a jacketed variety, encased in copper, brass, or iron/steel. There is less tolerance for gaps in understanding brought by research and development above the ordinary threshold of velocity for lead bullets. To mitigate significant material loss, the jacket of bullets may be bonded intricately to the lead core at a molecular level, typically by thermal adhesion or electrochemical processes. It is generally acknowledged that bonded bullets are capable of increased resilience under severe stress. Depending on experience and methodology exemplary bullets can be observed which are theoretically capable of optimal weight retention under the hydraulic forces of impact velocities roughly in the vicinity of 2300 to 2700 feet per second. Designs with more reactive expansion characteristics may exhibit optimal weight retention at much lower velocities. Above their optimal threshold, bonded bullets with resilient alloys and construction may perform diminishing yet remarkable returns for weight retention, where standard jacketed varieties circumstantially exhibit the risks brought by severe loss of integrity, which manifests to various effect.

Additionally, the shape of the jacket material may be designed to mechanically retain a lead core to prevent the bullet from severely separating. This can be accomplished either by completely compartmentalizing separate sections of the bullet, or by a retaining shelf on the interior meant to lock the lead core into place to ensure a sufficient degree of the softer core can be reinforced by a stronger metal as it deforms. Such construction does not alter the limitations of a given alloy, but can allow for designs with highly reactive expansion characteristics in a given circumstance to retain sufficient mass for some length of penetration, even when significant loss of material is to be expected.

== Gallery ==
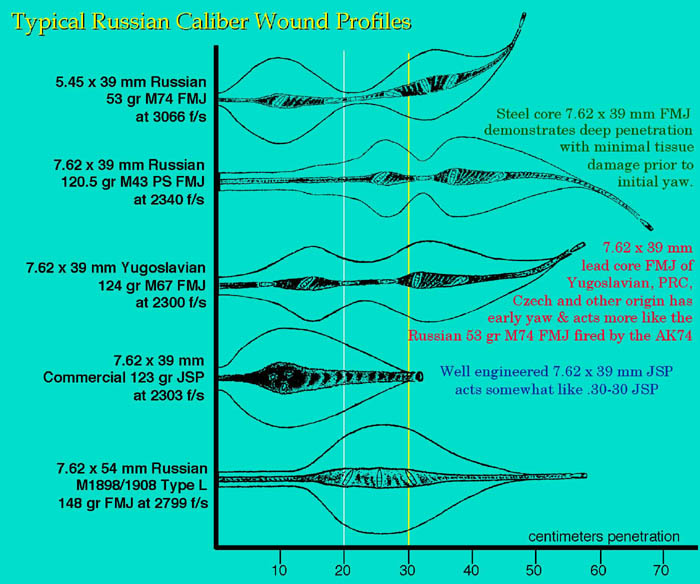
Wound ballistics for various Soviet cartridges

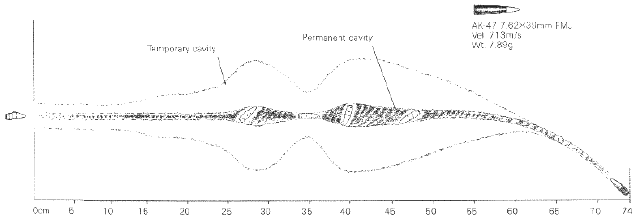
AK-47 7.62x39mm wound ballistics

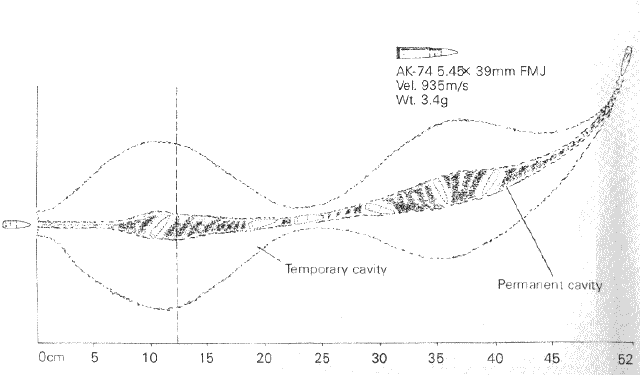
AK-74 5.45x39mm wound ballistics

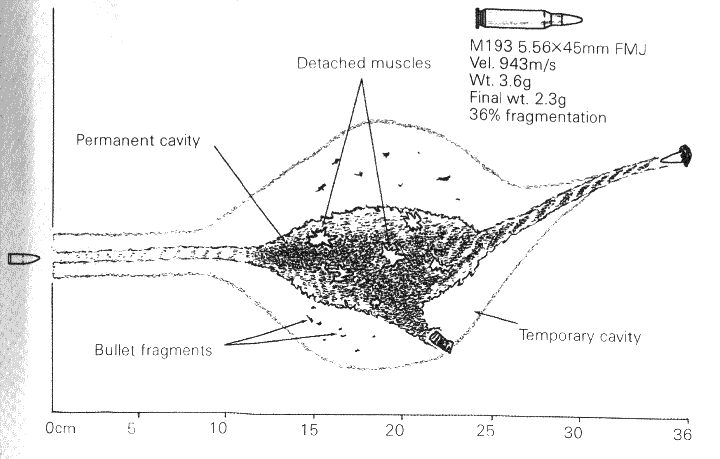
M16 5.56x45mm wound ballistics

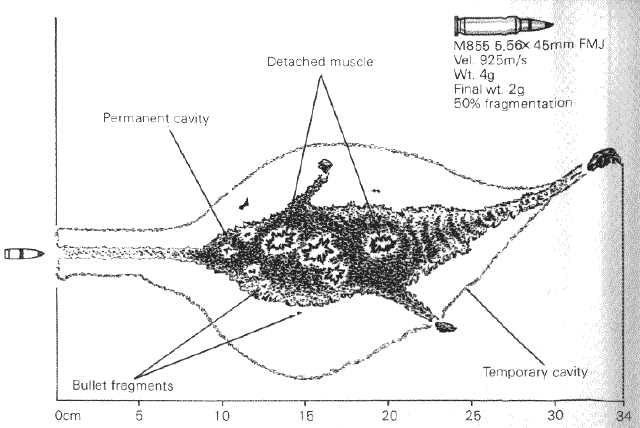
M16A2 M855 5.56X45mm NATO wound ballistics

== See also ==
- Terminal velocity
- Forensic ballistics
- Gunshot injury
- Hydrostatic shock
- Kinetic energy penetrator
- Stopping power
- Table of handgun and rifle cartridges
- Taylor KO factor
- Vaporific effect
