= Frangible bullet =

Bullets designed to reduce ricochet risk

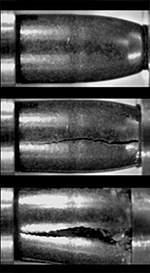
A sequence of photos showing a frangible bullet fracturing when subjected to high velocity strain waves

Frangible bullets are intended to disintegrate into tiny particles upon target impact to minimize their penetration of other objects. Small particles are slowed more rapidly by air resistance, and are less likely to cause injury or damage to persons and objects distant from the point of bullet impact.

Most frangible bullets are subject to brittle failure upon striking a hard target. This mechanism has been used to minimize the tendency of malleable lead and copper bullets to ricochet from hard targets as large, cohesive particles. Brittle failure may occur at subsonic velocity. Attempting to crimp a brittle frangible bullet into the cartridge case may break the bullet. Brittle frangible bullets may break during the self-loading cycle of semi-automatic firearms; and those fired from revolvers often break as the bullet encounters the barrel forcing cone after leaving the cylinder.

== Manufacturing ==
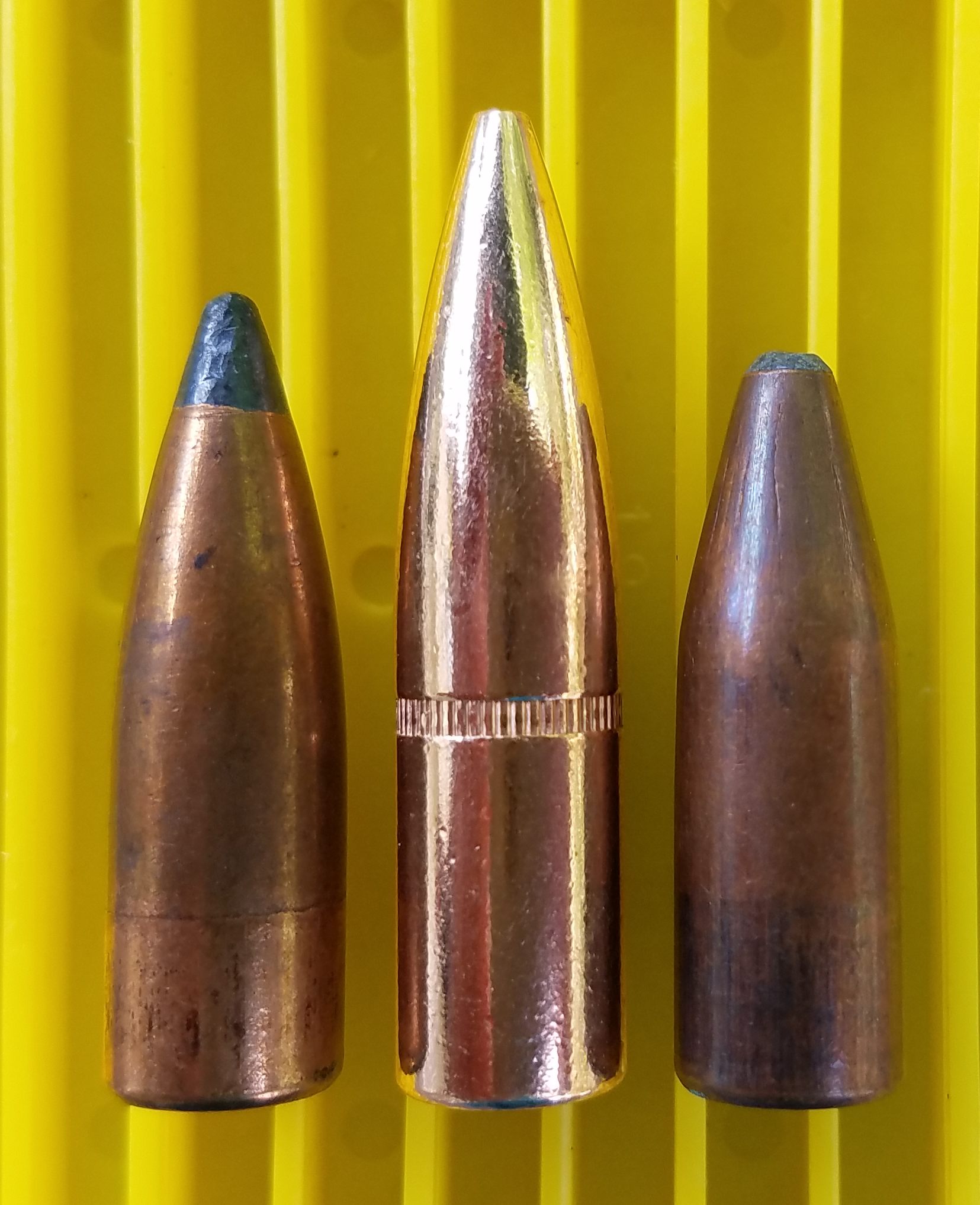
Frangible bullets may be lighter or longer than conventional bullets of the same calibre. The jacketed frangible bullet in the centre is longer than the outer soft-point bullets with traditional lead cores. Each of the three .30 calibre (7.62 mm) bullets weighs 150 grains (9.7 g) but the lower density frangible core requires greater volume.

Powder metallurgy techniques fabricate bullets from mixtures of powdered metals such as tin, copper, zinc and tungsten compressed at room temperature to produce a high-density material. Mechanical interlocking and cold welding bond the metal powders together such that they can be pressed directly to shape, or into bar stock that can be swaged into projectiles, with or without jacketing.

Alternative manufacturing techniques include sintering (heating and compressing powdered metals at temperatures below the melting point), or binding the powdered metal with an adhesive polymer in an injection moulding machine.

== Target damage ==
The mechanism of bullet disintegration varies with the energy transfer at the time of impact. With sufficient velocity, bullets may be vaporized upon impact. Few firearms can propel bullets at sufficient velocity to cause reliable vaporization at the target, and air resistance causes bullet velocity to decrease with increasing distance from the firing point; so frangible bullets typically rely upon other mechanisms for disintegration at lower velocities. Target characteristics are an important aspect of interaction with the bullet. Energy available to initiate the disintegration mechanism is limited by the rate at which the target slows the bullet; so bullets may pass through flexible, fragile or low-density materials without slowing the bullet enough to cause disintegration. Bullets must resist disintegration during handling, loading, and firing to reliably hit the target; so high-velocity loads may require a non-frangible jacket to protect a frangible core from disintegration prior to target impact. The jacket may ricochet, but should have reduced range without the weight of the frangible core. Frangible hollow-point bullets may penetrate clothing, drywall, and light sheet metal; but often disintegrate upon striking glass.

Hard targets may be damaged by frangible bullets. Extent of damage increases with velocity of bullet impact. Energy transfer at the point of impact may break brittle targets, and may temporarily soften and permanently deform malleable materials. Target crystalline structure may be changed to increase target damage by subsequent bullets. Steel targets designed to withstand rifle ammunition may be damaged by bullet velocities over 2,700 feet (820 m) per second; and lower velocity bullets may damage steel targets intended for pistol or rimfire ammunition.

Frangible bullets striking animal targets create wounds similar to conventional bullets. Some penetrate soft tissue similar to full metal jacket bullets. Some may disintegrate upon striking bone. Hunting bullets include a frangible core designed to disintegrate when a protective jacket is opened by softer tissue or fluid. Frangible bullets disintegrating in flesh cause very serious wounds with persistent effects.

Frangible bullets may represent an unconventional threat to personal armour intended to resist traditional lead bullets. At the request of the National Institute of Justice, staff of the Office of Law Enforcement Standards, located at the National Institute of Standards and Technology, has conducted a limited series of tests evaluating the performance of frangible ammunition against body armor. This preliminary study was designed to attempt to establish the validity of claims that these types of rounds pose a potential safety threat to personal body armor. The true scope and relevance of this threat was not known as of November 2002.

== Uses ==
Frangible bullets offer improved safety for specialized combat simulation training, which involves one or more shooters engaging multiple steel targets from various directions while moving through a 360 degree range, due to the decreased risk of ricochet, overpenetration, as well as decreasing lead exposure. Frangible bullets are also used in reduced ricochet, limited penetration (RRLP) loads intended to reduce risk to friendly forces and innocent persons during close quarters military or police actions in urban areas, aboard ships or aircraft, or in hazardous material environments like oil platforms and chemical or nuclear plants.

== History ==
Injuries from lead bullet fragments ricocheting off metal targets at 20th-century amusement park shooting galleries encouraged development of frangible bullets in specialized .22 Short gallery loads including Peters Krumble Ball, Remington Spatter-Less, Western Kant-Splash, and Winchester Spatterpruf. The United States used frangible lead/Bakelite M22 bullets in aircraft .30 caliber machine guns for target practice at armored RP-63 manned target aircraft. The lower density M22 bullets were of the same shape as conventional M2 bullets for reliable function through self-loading machine guns, but weighed only 110 grains (7.1 g) in comparison to 152 grains (9.8 g) for the M2 bullets.

In the early 21st-century, the United States military began using frangible bullets to reduce ricochet risk during small arms training. These bullets use nylon as a binding agent for a core of powdered copper and tungsten contained within a gilding metal jacket. A tungsten/nylon projectile core was developed by Ecomass Technologies to replace the lead core in the 3-part M855 5.56mm projectile and placed in service between 2000 and 2003. This projectile core performed similar to the lead core with the same, or better, accuracy.
