= Stopping power =

Ability of a firearm or other weapon to cause immediate incapacitation

Stopping power is the supposed ability of a weapon — typically a ranged weapon such as a firearm — to incapacitate or immobilize a target (human or animal). Stopping power contrasts with lethality in that it pertains only to a weapon's ability to make the target cease action, regardless of whether or not death ultimately occurs. Which ammunition cartridges have the greatest stopping power is a much-debated topic.

Stopping power is related to the physical properties and terminal behavior of the projectile (bullet, shot, or slug), the biology of the target, and the wound location, but the issue is complicated and not easily studied. Although higher-caliber ammunitions usually have greater muzzle energy and momentum and thus traditionally been widely associated with higher stopping power, the physics involved are multifactorial, with caliber, muzzle velocity, bullet mass, bullet shape and bullet material all contributing to the ballistics.

Despite much disagreement, the most popular theory of stopping power is that it is usually caused not by the force of the bullet but by the wounding effects of the bullet, which are typically a rapid loss of blood causing a circulatory failure, which leads to impaired motor function and/or unconsciousness. The "Big Hole School" and the principles of penetration and permanent tissue damage are in line with this way of thinking. The other prevailing theories focus more on the energy of the bullet and its effects on the nervous system, including hydrostatic shock and energy transfer, which is similar to kinetic energy deposit.

== History ==
The concept of stopping power appeared in the late 19th century when colonial troops (including American troops in the Philippines during the Moro Rebellion, and British soldiers during the New Zealand Wars) at close quarters found that their pistols were not able to stop charging native tribesmen. This led to the introduction or reintroduction of larger caliber weapons (such as the older .45 Colt and the newly developed .45 ACP) capable of stopping opponents with a single round.

During the Seymour Expedition in China, at one of the battles at Langfang, Chinese Boxers, armed with swords and spears, conducted a massed infantry charge against the forces of the Eight-Nation Alliance, who were equipped with rifles. At point-blank range, a British soldier had to fire four .303 Lee-Metford bullets into a Boxer before he stopped charging. U.S. Army officer Bowman McCalla reported that single rifle shots were not enough: multiple rifle shots were needed to halt a Boxer. Only machine guns were effective in immediately stopping the Boxers.

In the Moro Rebellion, Moro Muslim Juramentados in suicide attacks continued to charge against American soldiers even after being shot. Panglima Hassan in the Hassan uprising had to be shot dozens of times before he died. This forced the Americans to phase out .38 Long Colt revolvers and start using .45 Colt against the Moros.

British troops used expanding bullets during various conflicts in the Northwest Frontier in India, and the Mahdist War in Sudan. The British government voted against a prohibition on their use at the Hague Convention of 1899, although the prohibition only applied to international warfare.

In response to addressing stopping power issues, the Mozambique drill was developed to maximize the likelihood of a target's quick incapacitation.

"Manstopper" is an informal term used to refer to any combination of firearm and ammunition that can reliably incapacitate, or "stop", a human target immediately. For example, the .45 ACP round and the .357 Magnum round both have firm reputations as "manstoppers". Historically, one type of ammunition has had the specific tradename "Manstopper". Officially known as the Mk III cartridge, these were made to suit the British Webley .455 service revolver in the early 20th century. The ammunition used a 220-grain (14 g) cylindrical bullet with hemispherical depressions at both ends. The front acted as a hollow point deforming on impact while the base opened to seal the round in the barrel. It was introduced in 1898 for use against "savage foes", but fell quickly from favor due to concerns of breaching the Hague Convention's international laws on military ammunition, and was replaced in 1900 by re-issued Mk II pointed-bullet ammunition.

Some sporting arms are also referred to as "stoppers" or "stopping rifles". These powerful arms are often used by game hunters (or their guides) for stopping a suddenly charging animal, like a buffalo or an elephant.

== Dynamics of bullets ==
A bullet will destroy or damage any tissues which it penetrates, creating a wound channel. It will also cause nearby tissue to stretch and expand as it passes through tissue. These two effects are typically referred to as permanent cavity (the track left by the bullet as it penetrates flesh) and temporary cavity, which, as the name implies, is the temporary (instantaneous) displacement caused as the bullet travels through flesh, and is many times larger than the actual diameter of the bullet. These phenomena are unrelated to low-pressure cavitation in liquids.

The degree to which permanent and temporary cavitation occurs is dependent on the mass, diameter, material, design and velocity of the bullet. This is because bullets crush tissue, and do not cut it. A bullet constructed with a half-diameter ogive designed meplat and hard, solid copper alloy material may crush only the tissue directly in front of the bullet. This type of bullet (monolithic-solid rifle bullet) is conducive to causing more temporary cavitation as the tissue flows around the bullet, resulting in a deep and narrow wound channel. A bullet constructed with a two diameter, hollow point ogive designed meplat and low-antimony lead-alloy core with a thin gilding metal jacket material will crush tissue in front and to the sides as the bullet expands. Due to the energy expended in bullet expansion, velocity is lost more quickly. This type of bullet (hollow-point hand gun bullet) is conducive to causing more permanent cavitation as the tissue is crushed and accelerated into other tissues by the bullet, causing a shorter and wider wound channel. The exception to this general rule is non-expanding bullets which are long relative to their diameter. These tend to destabilize and yaw (tumble) soon after impact, increasing both temporary and permanent cavitation.

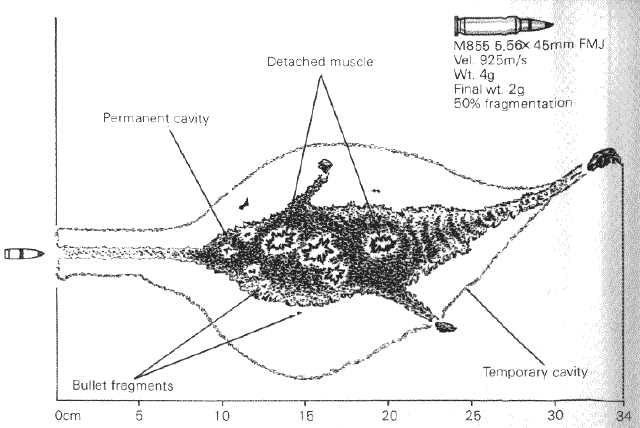
High velocity bullet fragmentation

Bullets are constructed to behave in different ways, depending on the intended target. Different bullets are constructed variously to: not expand upon impact, expand upon impact at high velocity, expand upon impact, expand across a broad range of velocities, expand upon impact at low velocity, tumble upon impact, fragment upon impact, or disintegrate upon impact.

To control the expansion of a bullet, meplat design and materials are engineered. The meplat designs are: flat; round to pointed depending on the ogive; hollow pointed which can be large in diameter and shallow or narrow in diameter and deep and truncated which is a long narrow punched hole in the end of a monolithic-solid type bullet. The materials used to make bullets are: pure lead; alloyed lead for hardness; gilding metal jacket which is a copper alloy of nickel and zinc to promote higher velocities; pure copper; copper alloy of bronze with tungsten steel alloy inserts to promote weight.

Some bullets are constructed by bonding the lead core to the jacket to promote higher weight retention upon impact, causing a larger and deeper wound channel. Some bullets have a web in the center of the bullet to limit the expansion of the bullet while promoting penetration. Some bullets have dual cores to promote penetration.

Bullets that might be considered to have stopping power for dangerous large game animals are usually 11.63 mm (.458 caliber) and larger, including 12-gauge shotgun slugs. These bullets are monolithic-solids; full metal jacketed and tungsten steel insert. They are constructed to hold up during close range, high velocity impacts. These bullets are expected to impact and penetrate, and transfer energy to the surrounding tissues and vital organs through the entire length of a game animal's body if need be.

The stopping power of firearms when used against humans is a more complex subject, in part because many persons voluntarily cease hostile actions when shot; they either flee, surrender, or fall immediately. This is sometimes referred to as "psychological incapacitation".

Physical incapacitation is primarily a matter of shot location; most persons who are shot in the head are immediately incapacitated, and most who are shot in the extremities are not, regardless of the firearm or ammunition involved. Shotguns will usually incapacitate with one shot to the torso, but rifles and especially handguns are less reliable, particularly those which do not meet the FBI's penetration standard, such as .25ACP, .32 S&W, and rimfire models. More powerful handguns may or may not meet the standard, or may even overpenetrate, depending on what ammunition is used.

Fully jacketed bullets penetrate deeply without much expansion, while soft or hollow point bullets create a wider, shallower wound channel. Pre-fragmented bullets such as Glaser Safety Slugs and MagSafe ammunition are designed to fragment into birdshot on impact with the target. This fragmentation is intended to create more trauma to the target, and also to reduce collateral damage caused from ricocheting or overpenetrating of the target and the surrounding environments such as walls. Fragmenting rounds have been shown to be unlikely to obtain deep penetration necessary to disrupt vital organs located at the back of a hostile human.

== Wounding effects ==
=== Physical ===
Permanent and temporary cavitation cause very different biological effects. A hole through the heart will cause loss of pumping efficiency, loss of blood, and eventual cardiac arrest. A hole through the liver or lung will be similar, with the lung shot having the added effect of reducing blood oxygenation; these effects however are generally slower to arise than damage to the heart. A hole through the brain can cause instant unconsciousness and will likely kill the recipient. A hole through the spinal cord will instantly interrupt the nerve signals to and from some or all extremities, disabling the target and in many cases also resulting in death (as the nerve signals to and from the heart and lungs are interrupted by a shot high in the chest or to the neck). By contrast, a hole through an arm or leg which hits only muscle will cause a great deal of pain but is unlikely to be fatal, unless one of the large blood vessels (femoral or brachial arteries, for example) is also severed in the process.

The effects of temporary cavitation are less well understood, due to a lack of a test material identical to living tissue. Studies on the effects of bullets typically are based on experiments using ballistic gelatin, in which temporary cavitation causes radial tears where the gelatin was stretched. Although such tears are visually engaging, some animal tissues (but not bone or liver) are more elastic than gelatin. In most cases, temporary cavitation is unlikely to cause anything more than a bruise. Some speculation states that nerve bundles can be damaged by temporary cavitation, creating a stun effect, but this has not been confirmed.

One exception to this is when a very powerful temporary cavity intersects with the spine. In this case, the resulting blunt trauma can slam the vertebrae together hard enough to either sever the spinal cord, or damage it enough to knock out, stun, or paralyze the target. For instance, in the shootout between eight FBI agents and two bank robbers in the 1986 FBI Miami shootout, Special Agent Gordon McNeill was struck in the neck by a high-velocity .223 bullet fired by Michael Platt. While the bullet did not directly contact the spine, and the wound incurred was not ultimately fatal, the temporary cavitation was sufficient to render SA McNeill paralyzed for several hours. Temporary cavitation may similarly fracture the femur if it is narrowly missed by a bullet.

Temporary cavitation can also cause the tearing of tissues if a very large amount of force is involved. The tensile strength of muscle ranges roughly from 1 to 4 MPa (145 to 580 lbf/in^{2}), and minimal damage will result if the pressure exerted by the temporary cavitation is below this. Gelatin and other less elastic media have much lower tensile strengths, thus they exhibit more damage after being struck with the same amount of force. At typical handgun velocities, bullets will create temporary cavities with much less than 1 MPa of pressure, and thus are incapable of causing damage to elastic tissues that they do not directly contact.

Rifle bullets that strike a major bone (such as a femur) can expend their entire energy into the surrounding tissue. The struck bone is commonly shattered at the point of impact.

High velocity fragmentation can also increase the effect of temporary cavitation. The fragments sheared from the bullet cause many small permanent cavities around the main entry point. The main mass of the bullet can then cause a truly massive amount of tearing as the perforated tissue is stretched.

Whether a person or animal will be incapacitated (i.e. "stopped") when shot, depends on a large number of factors, including physical, physiological, and psychological effects.

=== Neurological ===
The only way to immediately incapacitate a person or animal is to damage or disrupt their central nervous system (CNS) to the point of paralysis, unconsciousness, or death. Bullets can achieve this directly or indirectly. If a bullet causes sufficient damage to the brain or spinal cord, immediate loss of consciousness or paralysis, respectively, can result. However, these targets are relatively small and mobile, making them extremely difficult to hit even under optimal circumstances.

Bullets can indirectly disrupt the CNS by damaging the cardiovascular system so that it can no longer provide enough oxygen to the brain to sustain consciousness. This can be the result of bleeding from a perforation of a large blood vessel or blood-bearing organ, or the result of damage to the lungs or airway. If blood flow is completely cut off from the brain, a human still has enough oxygenated blood in their brain for 10–15 seconds of wilful action, though with rapidly decreasing effectiveness as the victim begins to lose consciousness.

Unless a bullet directly damages or disrupts the central nervous system, a person or animal will not be instantly and completely incapacitated by physiological damage. However, bullets can cause other disabling injuries that prevent specific actions (a person shot in the femur cannot run) and the physiological pain response from severe injuries will temporarily disable most individuals.

Several scientific papers reveal ballistic pressure wave effects on wounding and incapacitation, including central nervous system injuries from hits to the thorax and extremities. These papers document remote wounding effects for both rifle and pistol levels of energy transfer.

Recent work by Courtney and Courtney provides compelling support for the role of a ballistic pressure wave in creating remote neural effects leading to incapacitation and injury. This work builds upon the earlier works of Suneson et al. where the researchers implanted high-speed pressure transducers into the brain of pigs and demonstrated that a significant pressure wave reaches the brain of pigs shot in the thigh. These scientists observed neural damage in the brain caused by the distant effects of the ballistic pressure wave originating in the thigh. The results of Suneson et al. were confirmed and expanded upon by a later experiment in dogs which "confirmed that distant effect exists in the central nervous system after a high-energy missile impact to an extremity. A high-frequency oscillating pressure wave with large amplitude and short duration was found in the brain after the extremity impact of a high-energy missile ..." Wang et al. observed significant damage in both the hypothalamus and hippocampus regions of the brain due to remote effects of the ballistic pressure wave.

=== Psychological ===
Emotional shock, terror, or surprise can cause a person to faint, surrender, or flee when shot or shot at. There are many documented instances where people have instantly dropped unconscious when the bullet only hit an extremity, or even completely missed. Additionally, the muzzle blast and flash from many firearms are substantial and can cause disorientation, dazzling, and stunning effects. Flashbangs (stun grenades) and other less-lethal "distraction devices" rely exclusively on these effects.

Pain is another psychological factor, and can be enough to dissuade a person from continuing their actions.

Temporary cavitation can emphasize the impact of a bullet, since the resulting tissue compression is identical to simple blunt force trauma. It is easier for someone to feel when they have been shot if there is considerable temporary cavitation, and this can contribute to either psychological factor of incapacitation.

However, if a person is sufficiently enraged, determined, or intoxicated, they can simply shrug off the psychological effects of being shot. During the colonial era, when native tribesmen came into contact with firearms for the first time, there was no psychological conditioning that being shot could be fatal, and most colonial powers eventually sought to create more effective manstoppers.

Therefore, such effects are not as reliable as physiological effects at stopping people. Animals will not faint or surrender if injured, though they may become frightened by the loud noise and pain of being shot, so psychological mechanisms are generally less effective against non-humans.

== Penetration ==
According to Dr. Martin Fackler and the International Wound Ballistics Association (IWBA), between 12.5 and 14 inches (320 and 360 mm) of penetration in calibrated tissue simulant is optimal performance for a bullet which is meant to be used defensively, against a human adversary. They also believe that penetration is one of the most important factors when choosing a bullet (and that the number one factor is shot placement). If the bullet penetrates less than their guidelines, it is inadequate, and if it penetrates more, it is still satisfactory though not optimal. The FBI's penetration requirement is very similar at 12 to 18 inches (300 to 460 mm).

A penetration depth of 12.5 to 14 inches (320 to 360 mm) may seem excessive, but a bullet sheds velocity—and crushes a narrower hole—as it penetrates deeper, so the bullet might be crushing a very small amount of tissue (simulating an "ice pick" injury) during its last two or three inches of travel, giving only between 9.5 to 12 inches (240 to 300 mm) of effective wide-area penetration. Also, skin is elastic and tough enough to cause a bullet to be retained in the body, even if the bullet had a relatively high velocity when it hit the skin. About 250 feet per second (76 m/s) velocity is required for an expanded hollow point bullet to puncture skin 50% of the time.

The IWBA's and FBI's penetration guidelines are to ensure that the bullet can reach a vital structure from most angles, while retaining enough velocity to generate a large diameter hole through tissue. An extreme example where penetration would be important is if the bullet first had to enter and then exit an outstretched arm before impacting the torso. A bullet with low penetration might embed itself in the arm whereas a higher penetrating bullet would penetrate the arm then enter the thorax where it would have a chance of hitting a vital organ.

== Overpenetration ==
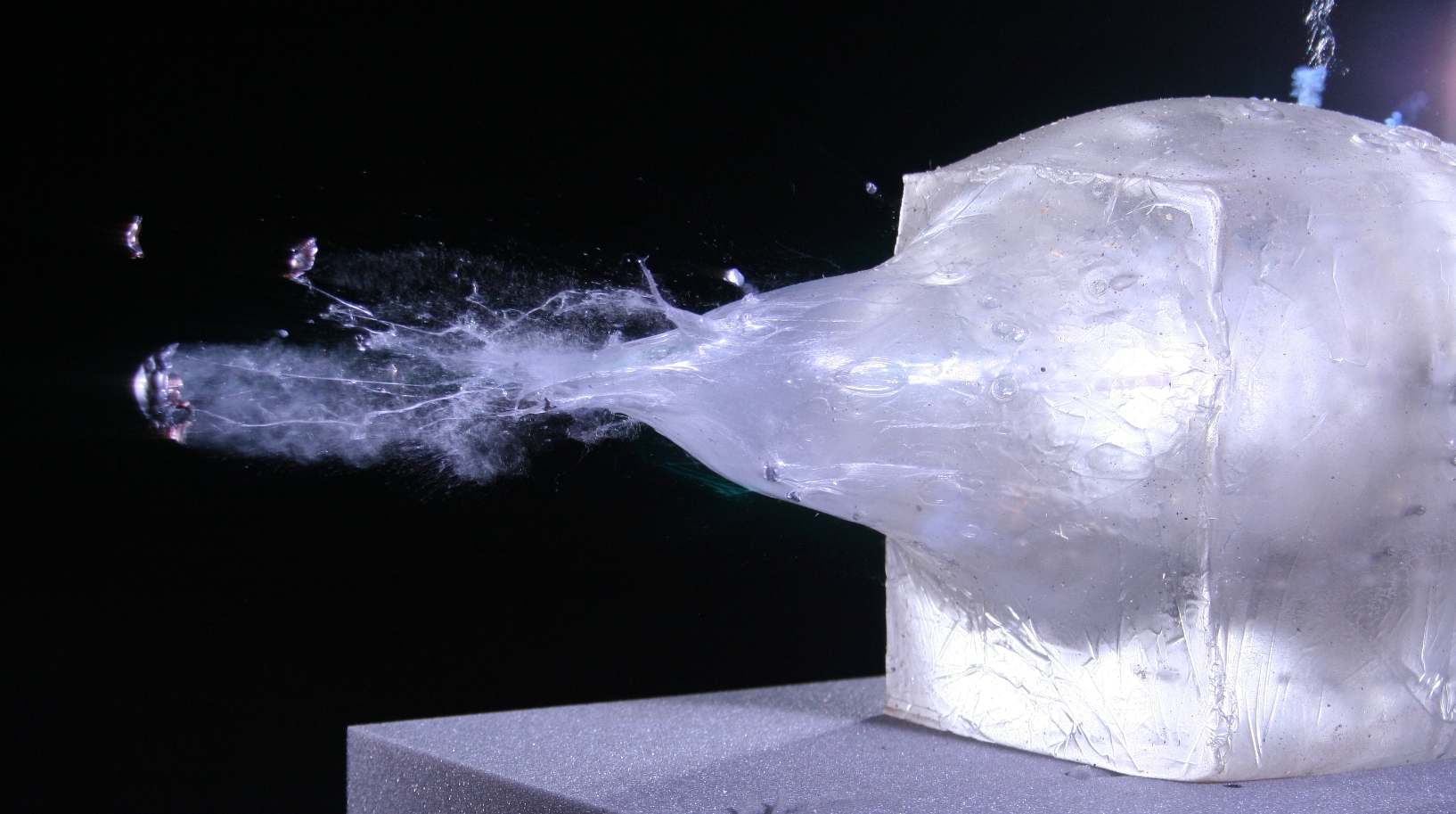
Overpenetration of a projectile through a synthetic ordnance gelatin.

Excessive penetration or overpenetration occurs when a bullet passes through its intended target and out of the other side, with enough residual kinetic energy to continue flying as a stray projectile and risk causing unintended collateral damage to objects or persons beyond. This happens because the bullet has not released all its kinetic energy within the target, according to the energy transfer hypothesis.

== Other hypotheses ==
These hypotheses are a matter of some debate among scientists in the field:

=== Energy transfer ===
The energy transfer hypothesis states that for small arms in general, the more energy transferred to the target, the greater the stopping power. It postulates that the pressure wave exerted on soft tissues by the bullet's temporary cavity hits the nervous system with a jolt of shock and pain and thereby forces incapacitation.

Proponents of this theory contend that the incapacitation effect is similar to that seen in non-concussive blunt-force trauma events, such as a knock-out punch to the body, a football player "shaken up" as result of a hard tackle, or a hitter being struck by a fastball. Pain in general has an inhibitory and weakening effect on the body, causing a person under physical stress to take a seat or even collapse. The force put on the body by the temporary cavity is supersonic compression, like the lash of a whip. While the lash only affects a short line of tissue across the back of the victim, the temporary cavity affects a volume of tissue roughly the size and shape of a football. Giving further credence to this theory is the support from the aforementioned effects of drugs on incapacitation. Pain killers, alcohol, and PCP have all been known to decrease the effects of nociception and increase a person's resistance to incapacitation, all while having no effect on blood loss.

Kinetic energy is a function of the bullet's mass and the square of its velocity. Generally speaking, it is the intention of the shooter to deliver an adequate amount of energy to the target via the projectiles. All else held equal, bullets that are light and fast tend to have more energy than those that are heavy and slow.

Over-penetration is detrimental to stopping power in regards to energy. This is because a bullet that passes through the target does not transfer all of its energy to the target. Lighter bullets tend to have less penetration in soft tissue and therefore are less likely to over-penetrate. Expanding bullets and other tip variations can increase the friction of the bullet through soft tissue, and/or allow internal ricochets off bone, therefore helping prevent over-penetration.

Non-penetrating projectiles can also possess stopping power and give support to the energy transfer hypothesis. Notable examples of projectiles designed to deliver stopping power without target penetration are Flexible baton rounds (commonly known as "beanbag bullets") and the rubber bullet, types of reduced-lethality ammunition.

The force exerted by a projectile upon tissue is equal to the bullet's local rate of kinetic energy loss, with distance $\mathrm{d}E_k/\mathrm{d}x$ (the first derivative of the bullet's kinetic energy with respect to position). The ballistic pressure wave is proportional to this retarding force, and this retarding force is also the origin of both temporary cavitation and prompt damage.

=== Hydrostatic shock ===
Hydrostatic shock is a controversial theory of terminal ballistics that states a penetrating projectile (such as a bullet) can produce a sonic pressure wave that causes "remote neural damage", "subtle damage in neural tissues" and/or "rapid incapacitating effects" in living targets. Proponents of the theory contend that damage to the brain from hydrostatic shock from a shot to the chest occurs in humans with most rifle cartridges and some higher-velocity handgun cartridges. Hydrostatic shock is not the shock from the temporary cavity itself, but rather the sonic pressure wave that radiates away from its edges through static soft tissue.

==== Knockback ====
The idea of "knockback" implies that a bullet can have enough force to stop the forward motion of an attacker and physically knock them backwards or downwards. It follows from the law of conservation of momentum that no "knockback" could ever exceed the recoil felt by the shooter, and therefore has no use as a weapon. The myth of "knockback" has been spread through its confusion with the phrase "stopping power" as well as by many films, which show bodies flying backward after being shot.

The idea of knockback was first widely expounded in ballistics discussions during American involvement in Philippine insurrections and, simultaneously, in British conflicts in its colonial empire, when front-line reports stated that the .38 Long Colt caliber revolvers carried by U.S. and British soldiers were incapable of bringing down a charging warrior. Thus, in the early 1900s, the U.S. reverted to the .45 Colt in single action revolvers, and later adopted the .45 ACP cartridge in what was to become the M1911A1 pistol, and the British had already adopted the .455 Webley caliber cartridge in 1887 in the Webley Revolver, replacing an earlier (1868) .450” cartridge. The larger cartridges were chosen largely due to the Big Hole Theory (a larger hole does more damage), but the common interpretation was that these were changes from a light, deeply penetrating bullet to a larger, heavier "manstopper" bullet.

Though popularized in television and movies, and commonly referred to as "true stopping power", the effect of knockback from a handgun and indeed most personal weapons is largely a myth. The momentum of the so-called "manstopper" .45 ACP bullet is approximately that of a 1 pound (0.45 kg) mass dropped from a height of 11.4 feet (3.5 m). (Note: Momentum is different from kinetic energy; an equivalent kinetic energy [855 ft·lb_{f} (1159 J)] of a typical .45 ACP bullet is that of a 60-pound (27 kg) mass dropped from a height of 14 feet (4.3 m)) or that of a 57 mph (92 km/h) baseball. Such a force is simply incapable of arresting a running target's forward momentum. In addition, many bullets are designed to penetrate instead of strike a blunt force blow, because, in penetrating, more severe tissue damage is done.

Sometimes "knockdown power" is a phrase used interchangeably with "knockback", while other times it's used interchangeably with "stopping power".

=== One-shot stop ===
This hypothesis is based on a claimed statistical analysis of actual shooting incidents from various reporting sources (typically police agencies). It considers the history of shooting incidents for a given factory ammunition load and compiles the percentage of "one-shot-stops" achieved with each specific ammunition load. That percentage is then intended to be used with other information to help predict the effectiveness of that load getting a "one-shot-stop".

=== Big hole school ===
This school of thought says that the bigger the hole in the target, the higher the rate of bleed-out and thus the higher the rate of the aforementioned "one-shot stop". According to this theory, as the bullet does not pass entirely through the body, it incorporates the energy transfer and the overpenetration ideals.

The theory centers on the "permanent cavitation" element of a handgun wound. A big hole damages more tissue. In the extreme, a heavier bullet (which preserves momentum greater than a lighter bullet of the same caliber) may "overpenetrate", passing completely through the target without expending all of its kinetic energy.

=== Other contributing factors ===
As mentioned earlier, there are many factors, such as drug and alcohol levels within the body, body mass index, mental illness, motivation levels, and gunshot location on the body which may determine which round will kill or at least catastrophically affect a target during any given situation.

== See also ==
- Table of handgun and rifle cartridges
- Taylor knock-out factor
