= TMJ (disambiguation) =

TMJ may refer to:

- Temporomandibular joint connecting the jaw to the skull
  - Temporomandibular joint dysfunction, pain in the jaw
- Ten Mile Junction LRT station, a closed Light Rail Transit station in Singapore on the Bukit Panjang LRT line (LRT station abbreviation: TMJ)
- Ten Mile Junction Depot, the depot for the Bukit Panjang LRT line
- Tohoku Mathematical Journal
- The Milwaukee Journal, a forerunner newspaper to the current-day Milwaukee Journal Sentinel
- Tunku Mahkota Johor or the Crown Prince of Johor in Malaysia, currently Tunku Ismail Idris
- Too Much Joy, American alternative rock group
- Total metal jacket bullet, a small-arms projectile
- Termez Airport, Uzbekistan, near the Afghan border (IATA code: TMJ)
- Samarokena language of Indonesian Papua (ISO code: tmj)
- WTMJ (AM), a radio station in Milwaukee, Wisconsin known casually as "TMJ"
- WTMJ-TV, an NBC-affiliated television station in Milwaukee, Wisconsin which utilizes the on-air branding of "TMJ4"
