= Meplat =

Flat or open tip on nose of a bullet

The meplat (from the French word "méplat" meaning "flat surface of a cylinder") is the technical term for the flat or open tip on the nose of a bullet. The shape of the meplat is important in determining how the bullet moves through the air. In particular the size and shape of the meplat has a significant effect on the ballistic coefficient of a bullet.

== Theory ==
Trimming the meplat (cutting the tip of the bullet, thus increasing its area) decreases the bullet's ballistic coefficient, increasing drag, and making it more susceptible to wind drift. So even though the grouping will be tighter, the time of flight and wind drift will be slightly greater.

Pointing the meplat (reducing its area) involves pressing the bullets into a special die. This decreases the size of the meplat which increases the ballistic coefficient, which reduces drag, time of flight, and wind drift of the bullet. Some target shooters sort their bullets by weight, point their bullets, and then trim them to the same meplat width to ensure the greatest possible consistency.

Meplats are often used to increase the bullet's wounding ability.

The shape of the nose of a, length-constrained, axisymmetric projectile that gives it the least possible aerodynamic drag at hypersonic speeds always has a meplat, the diameter of which depends on the length of the nose.

== Varying meplats ==
If the meplats on a group of bullets are uneven, the trajectory of the bullets will vary which will cause the bullets to strike the target at different vertical locations. Bullets of the same mass that have similar-shaped meplats will travel through the air in nearly identical fashion, making it easier to group shots together or hit a target multiple times. For this reason, competitive shooters and snipers often trim or point their meplats to uniform shape.

Rounds of the same caliber, but with different-shaped meplats sometimes cannot be loaded into the same firearm. The meplat plays an important role in the loading of weapons whose ammunition is guided into the chamber by a mechanism (e.g., semi-automatic, pump-action, lever-action, or bolt-action firearms), though this usually is not as important in weapons whose rounds are chambered individually by hand (e.g., single-shots, multiple-barrel firearms, combination guns, or revolvers.)

== See also ==
- Full metal jacket bullet
- Hollow-point bullet
- Semiwadcutter
- Soft-point bullet
- Wadcutter
