= Total metal jacket =

Type of bullet

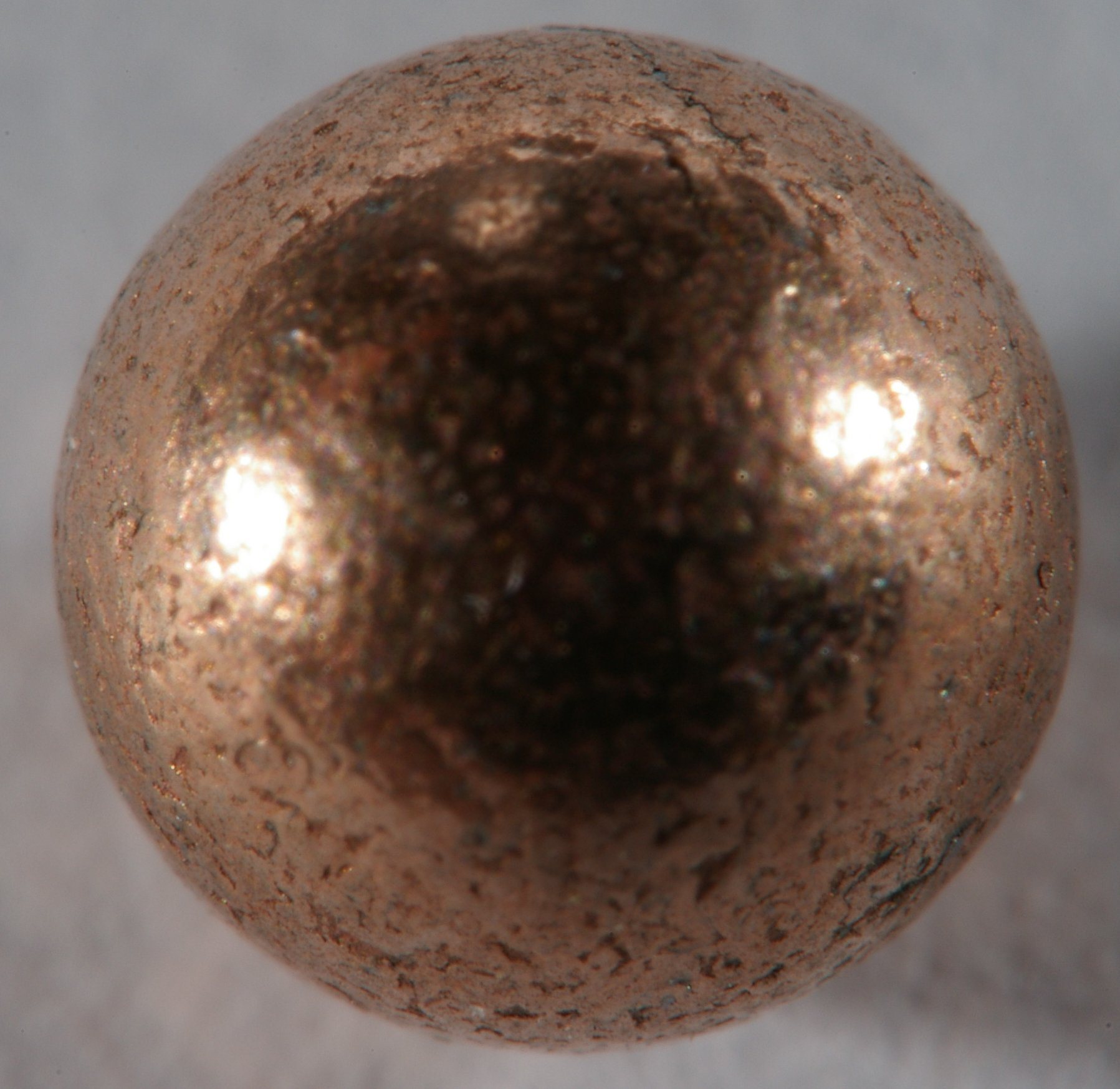
This steel-core BB has an electroplated copper jacket to prevent the core from rusting.

Total metal jacket (TMJ or full metal case) bullets are made by electroplating a thin jacket of ductile metal (usually copper) over a core of different metal requiring protection from abrasion or corrosion. Similar full metal jacket bullets mechanically swage a thin sheet of metal over the core. The swaging process leaves an opening exposing the core on the base or nose of the bullet, while electroplating deposits a jacket over the entire bullet surface. Protecting the base of a lead-core bullet from burning powder gas may prevent molten lead from being released as a fine spray in turbulent gas leaving the muzzle of a firearm. Electrolytic deposition can create very thin jackets, while jackets applied by swaging must be thick enough to avoid being torn during the swaging process. Uniformly electroplated jackets may produce more accurate bullets than jacket and core materials deformed during swaging. Thinner electroplated jackets may not be as strong as conventional swaged jackets of similar metal, and may not prevent leading at higher bullet velocities. Thinner jackets may be damaged by and foul barrel ports for gas-operated reloading or recoil compensation.
