= Soft-point bullet =

Type of bullet that expands on impact with a solid object

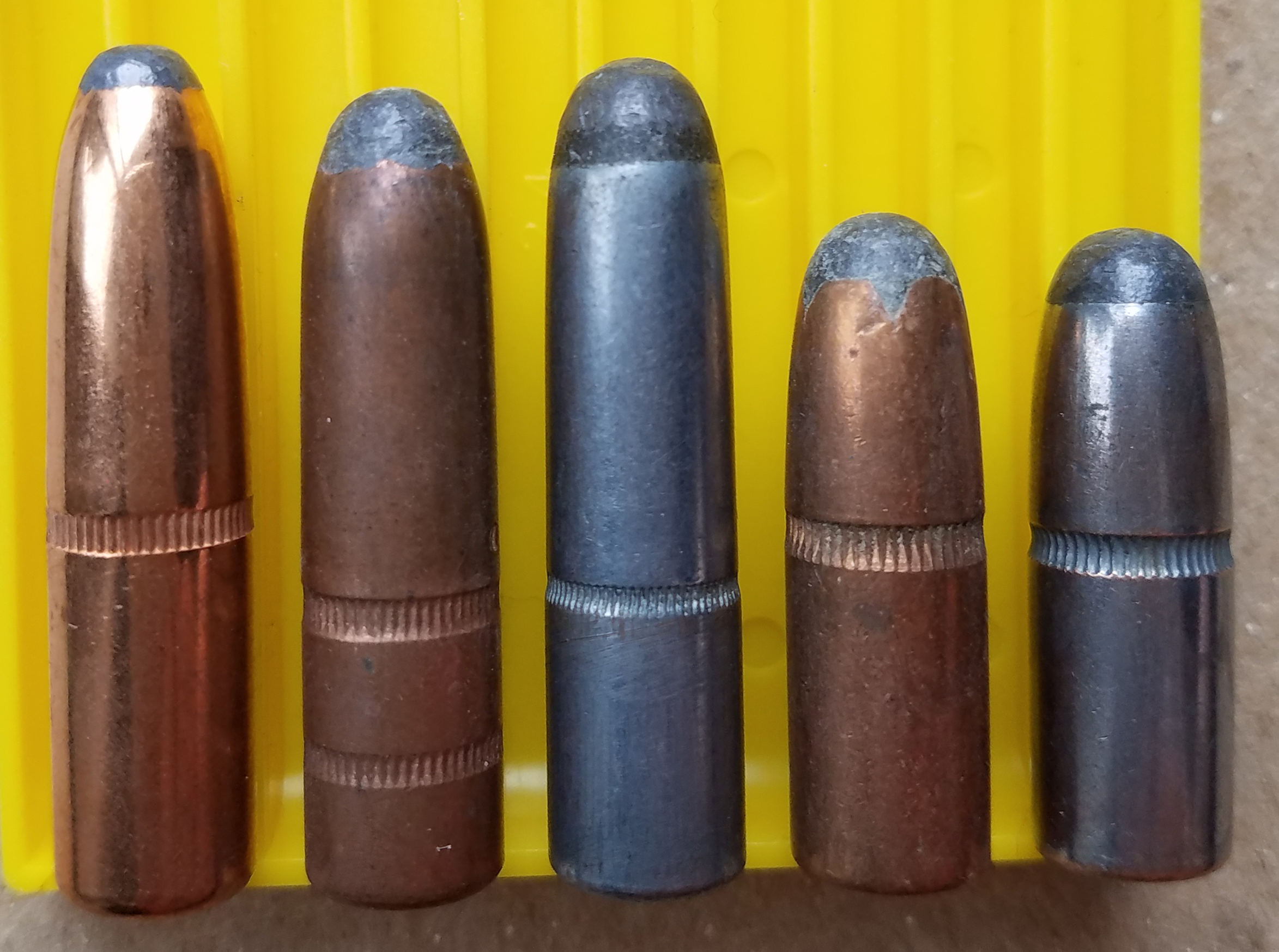
An assortment of .30-caliber (7.62 mm) round-nose bullets illustrating the exposed lead tip characteristic of soft-point bullets.

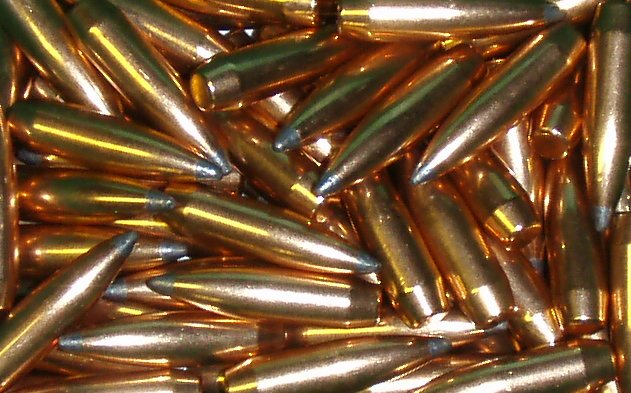
Some soft point bullets have a more aerodynamic contour like these spitzer boat-tail bullets

A soft-point bullet (SP), also known as a soft-nosed bullet, is a jacketed expanding bullet with a soft metal core enclosed by a stronger metal jacket left open at the forward tip. A soft-point bullet is intended to expand upon striking flesh to cause a wound diameter greater than the bullet diameter. Jacketed soft point bullets are usually abbreviated JSP in the ammunition and reloading industry. The use of soft-point bullets in warfare is a violation of the Hague Convention of 1899, declaration IV, 3.

== Evolution ==
Lead-alloy bullets used with gunpowder firearms were unsatisfactory at the bullet velocities available from rifles loaded with nitrocellulose propellants such as cordite. By the late 19th century, lead-alloy bullets were being enclosed within a jacket of stronger mild steel or copper alloyed with nickel or zinc to reliably impart stabilizing rotation in rifled barrels. The lead-alloy core was swaged into a cup of the stronger metal covering the front and sides of the core, but leaving some of the core exposed on the base of the bullet. The bullet jacket may be described as a metal envelope, steel envelope, or hard envelope; and the jacketed bullet may be described as metal-covered, metal-patched, or metal-cased. But while these new types of projectile were easier to stabilize at the new high velocities, it was discovered that the new jacketed design was actually less lethal than the softer lead-alloy types that had preceded it.

The jacketed bullets were typically of smaller diameter than the previous lead-alloy type, and the stronger jacket made them less likely to be deformed on impact. Such deformation increases the effective diameter of the projectile and can also cause an erratic trajectory within the wound. Enclosing the lead or alloy within a hard jacket cuts down on these tendencies despite the greater velocities employed, and this in conjunction with the typically smaller calibre created a greater tendency for the new rifle bullets both to create a smaller wound and to pass through, rather than lodging within, the anatomy of the target whether human or animal, thus increasing the probability of wounding rather than killing. For this reason, full metal jacket rounds are considered more humane for military purposes; conversely, they are less effective for hunting animals where killing the quarry swiftly is the objective. To produce a smokeless-propellant round that would engage in rifling efficiently but also match or exceed the lethality of the old, low-velocity ammunition it was necessary to invent the soft-point. The process was not difficult: reversing the direction of jacket placement leaves the lead-alloy core exposed at the forward tip of the projectile creating a soft-point bullet.

== Expansion ==
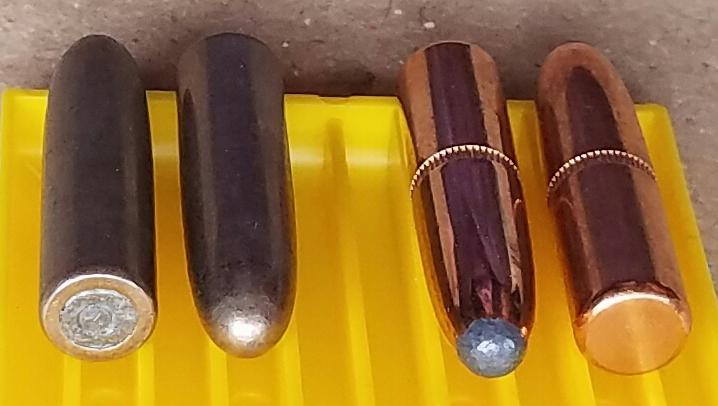
This image illustrates the jacket placement difference between full metal jacket bullets on the left and soft point bullets on the right. Both bullet types are 220-grain (14 g) .30-caliber. The silver-colored cupronickel jacketed bullets on the left have an enclosed rounded point with a jacket opening on the flat base, while the copper-colored gilding metal jacketed bullets on the right have an enclosed flat base with a jacket opening on the rounded point.

Soft-point bullets expose the soft lead-alloy core on the forward part of the bullet most likely to be deformed when striking a target. The sides of the bullet remain covered by the jacket to reliably impart stabilizing rotation from rifling. Expansion of a soft-point bullet depends upon the hardness of the lead-alloy core, the strength of the surrounding metal jacket, and the energy available from the decrease in bullet velocity as the bullet encounters target resistance. A core of pure lead is softer than a core of lead alloyed with metals like antimony and tin. Some jacket alloys have greater tensile strength than others; and, for any given alloy and annealing process, a thicker jacket will be stronger than a thinner jacket. Energy available to expand the bullet is proportional to the square of the velocity at which the bullet strikes the target. If the bullet passes through the target, the energy represented by the square of the velocity of the departing bullet has no effect on the target. Soft point bullets may not expand if they strike a target at low velocity, or if the target does not slow the bullet enough to deform the exposed point or rupture the surrounding jacket.

Varmint rifle bullets with thin jackets are intended to expand rapidly and disintegrate upon encountering minimum resistance. Bullets intended for big-game hunting are designed to increase their forward diameter while remaining intact to penetrate deeply enough to damage internal organs likely to cause rapid death. Big-game bullets sometimes have a specialized jacket including a center baffle between a forward core intended to expand and another core intended to remain intact. Alternative designs include a jacket with an internally thicker belt around the central part of the bullet intended to resist expansion while the thinner forward part of the bullet jacket ruptures. Some bullets have a core formed from a soft alloy in the forward part of the bullet bonded to a harder alloy core in the rear of the bullet. Others have a jacket which is thicker near the base of the bullet and tapers to a thin fringe adjacent to the soft point.

== Hollow-point bullets ==
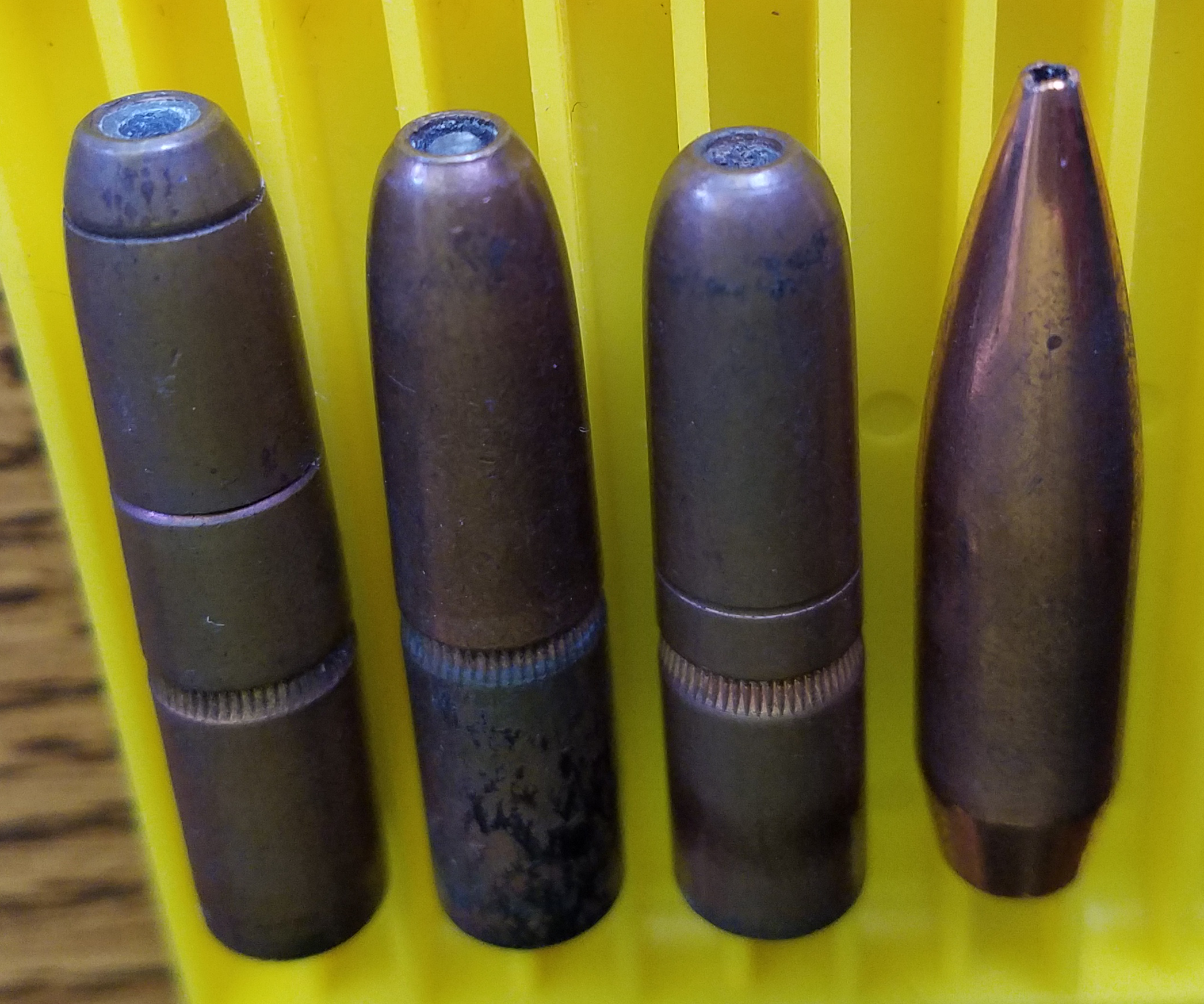
Four .30 caliber (7.62 mm) hollow point bullets. Each of the three round-nose bullets on the left has a small cavity at the jacket opening on the leading tip of the bullet. Such bullets are sometimes called open-point bullets, as opposed to soft-point bullets where the lead core extends forward of the jacket. The jacket of the very-low-drag bullet on the right provides an aerodynamic windscreen enclosing a void so the center of mass of the entire bullet remains within the full diameter portion of the bullet, to minimize misalignment with the bore axis.

Soft-point bullets are similar to jacketed hollow-point bullets, because each has a jacket open on the forward tip. The soft core is exposed forward of the jacket on soft-point bullets, while the jacket may extend forward of the core on hollow-point bullets emphasizing aerodynamic improvement rather than expansion. Bullets with a large amount of core exposed forward of the jacket might have a hollow point within that core; and some hollow-point bullets have no jackets.

== Flat-point bullets ==
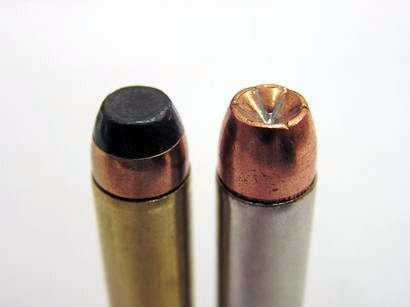
.357 Magnum rounds. Left: Jacketed flat/soft point (JFP/JSP). Right: Jacketed hollow point (JHP). JSP is a semi-jacketed round as the jacket does not extend to the tip. The notches on the tip of the JHP assist in the expansion of the bullet on impact with soft tissue.

Jacketed flat point (JFP) may describe either soft-point or full metal jacket bullets with a flat, rather than a rounded front. Until recently, flat-point bullets were required in centerfire rifles with tubular magazines, such as Winchester rifles, where the rounds are stored front-to-back. Use of metal-pointed bullets in these rifles can be highly dangerous, as the point of the bullet will rest against the primer of the round in front of it and can cause a detonation under the force of recoil. Since late 2005, newer bullet designs with polymer tips offering improved ballistics have become available for safe use in tubular magazine rifles.

== See also ==
- List of firearms
- List of rifle cartridges
- List of handgun cartridges
