= Gilding metal =

Brass composed of copper and a small amount of zinc

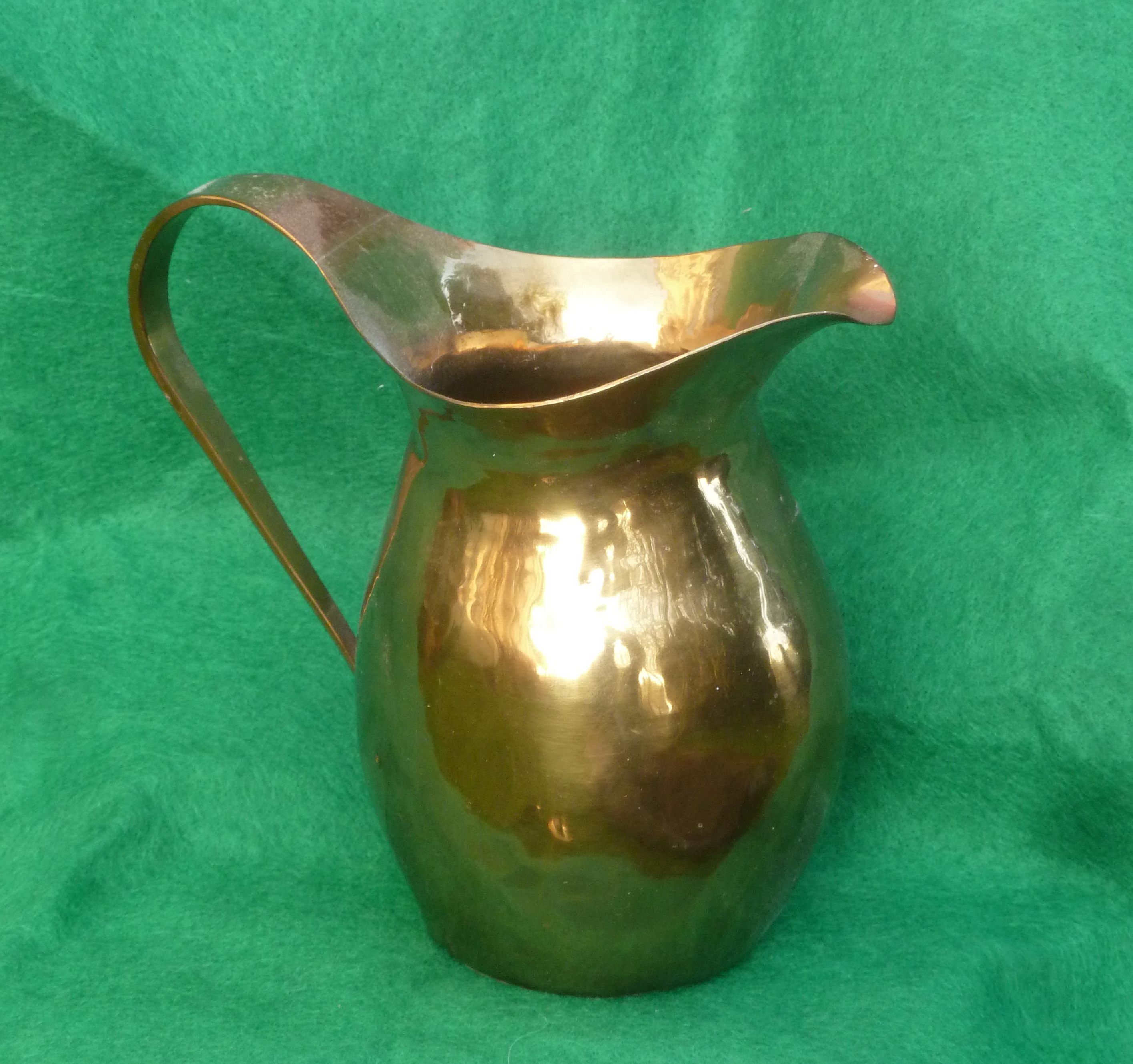
Raised jug, in gilding metal. Made in an English school metalwork class, 1970s–1980s

Gilding metal is a form of brass (an alloy of copper and zinc) with a much higher copper content than zinc content. Exact figures range from 95% copper and 5% zinc to “8 parts copper to 1 of zinc” (11% zinc) in British Army Dress Regulations.

Gilding metal is used for various purposes, including the jackets of bullets, driving bands on some artillery shells, as well as enameled badges and other jewellery. The sheet is widely used for craft metalworking by hammer working. It is also used particularly as a lower-cost training material for silversmiths. Starting in 1944, shell casings made of gilding metal were melted down by the United States Mint to be made into pennies. These pennies replaced the less popular steel cent of 1943, and the pennies of this composition were produced until 1946.

Gilding metal was also used for the "bronze" Olympic medal at the 2020 Summer Olympics held in Tokyo, Japan in 2021.

Gilding metal may be annealed by heating to between 800–1,450 °F (427–788 °C). It should be cooled slowly afterwards, to reduce risk of cracking.

== See also ==
- Pinchbeck alloy
