= Full metal jacket (ammunition) =

Type of bullet with a harder outer shell

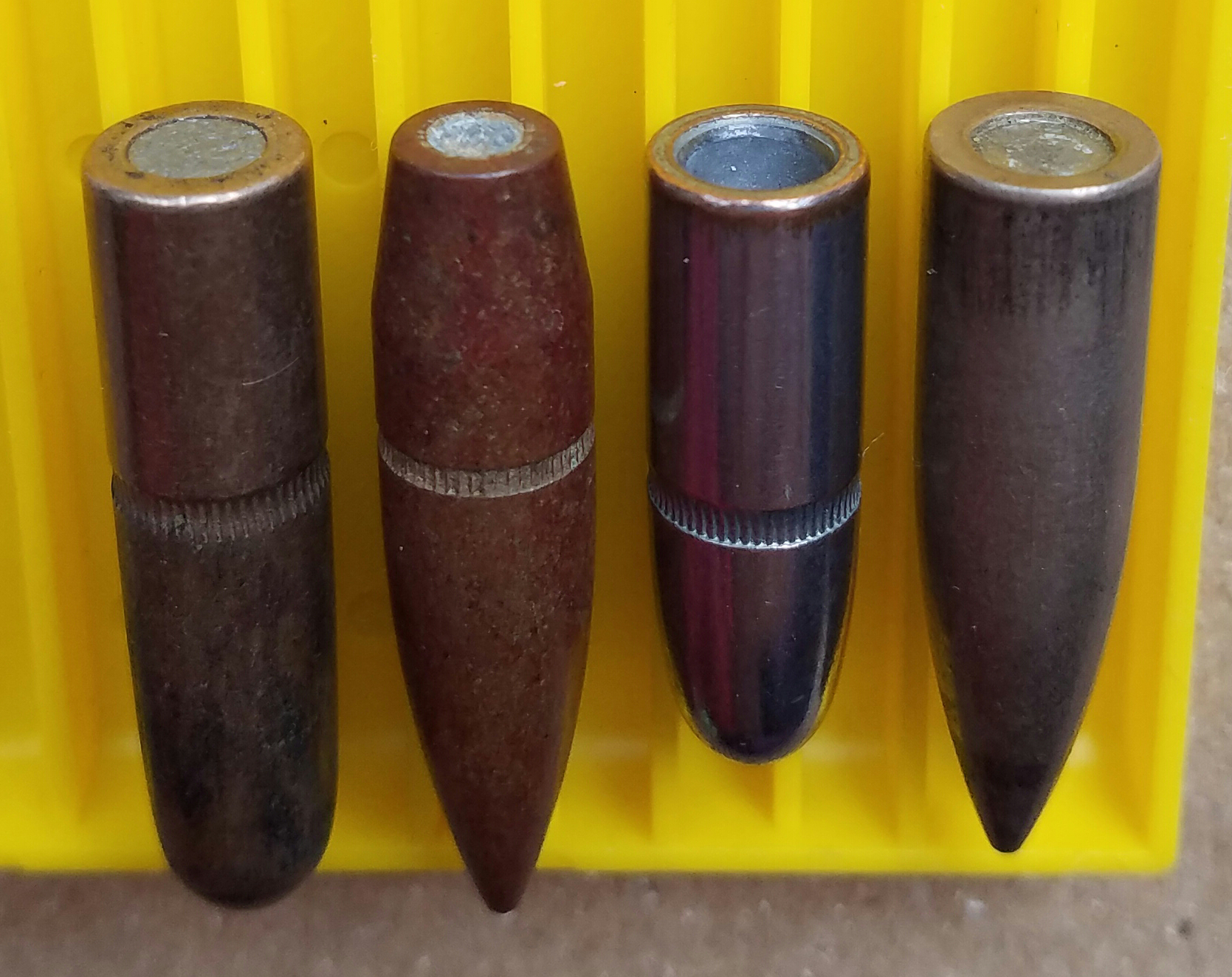
These .30-caliber (7.62 mm) full metal jacket bullets show the typical jacket openings exposing the lead alloy core on the base of the bullet to illustrate that a full metal jacket may not completely enclose the core.

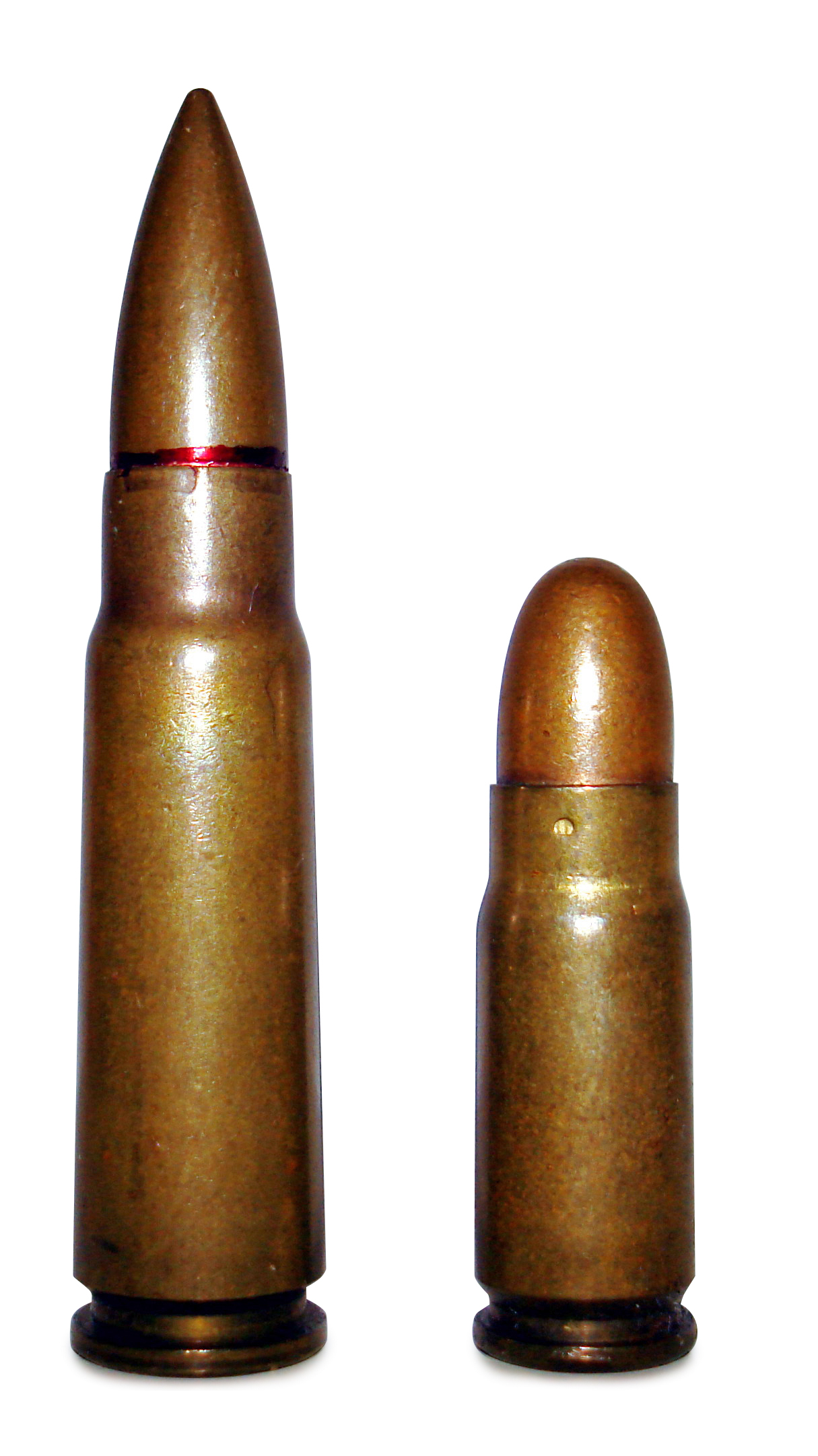
Examples of FMJ bullets in their usual shapes: pointed ("spitzer") loaded in the 7.62×39mm rifle and round-nosed loaded in the 7.62×25mm pistol cartridges

A full metal jacket (FMJ) bullet is a small-arms projectile consisting of a soft core (often lead) encased in an outer shell ("jacket") of harder metal, such as gilding metal, cupronickel, or, less commonly, a steel alloy. A bullet jacket usually allows higher muzzle velocities than a lead alloy cast bullet without depositing significant amounts of metal in the bore. It also prevents damage to bores from hard steel or armor-piercing core materials. The term ball ammunition is often used to mean FMJ.

== History ==
Despite a widespread belief that the full metal jacket bullet was invented ca. 1882 by Swiss Colonel Eduard Rubin while he was working for the Swiss Federal Ammunition Factory and Research Center, in fact it was known already in the 1880s that the actual inventor was Prussian Major (later Lt.-Col.) Julius Emil Bode (1835–1885), who came up with the idea in either 1875 or 1876.

The use of full metal jacketing in military ammunition came about in part because of the need for improved feeding characteristics in small arms that used internal mechanical manipulation of the cartridge in order to chamber rounds, as opposed to externally hand-reloading single-shot firearms. The harder metal used in bullet jackets was less prone to deformation than softer, exposed lead, which improved feeding. Full metal jacketing also allowed bullets to withstand much higher velocities caused by the decrease of the caliber.

In addition to the various advantages afforded by FMJ rounds, the Hague Convention of 1899, Declaration III, prohibits in international warfare the use of bullets that easily expand or flatten in the body.

== Impact characteristics ==
By design, a fully jacketed projectile has less capacity to expand after contact with the target than a hollow-point projectile or a soft-point projectile. Although that can be an advantage when engaging targets behind cover, it can also be a disadvantage because an FMJ bullet may pierce completely through a target, leading to less-severe wounding and, possibly, failure to disable the target. Furthermore, a projectile that goes completely through a target can cause unintentional damage behind the target.

== See also ==
- Total metal jacket
