= List of Rizzoli & Isles episodes =

Rizzoli & Isles is an American crime drama series based on the novels by Tess Gerritsen, starring Angie Harmon and Sasha Alexander as the respective title characters. It premiered on TNT on July 12, 2010, and set a record as cable TV's most watched commercial-supported series launch. The premiere was later recognized as the all-time most successful cable series launch, with DVR viewers the week of the premiere increasing viewership to just over 9 million.

As of September 5, 2016, 105 episodes of Rizzoli & Isles have aired.

== Series overview ==
Season	Episodes	Originally released	
Season	Episodes	First released	Last released
1	10	July 12, 2010	September 13, 2010
2	15	July 11, 2011	December 26, 2011
3	15	June 5, 2012	December 25, 2012
4	16	June 25, 2013	March 18, 2014
5	18	June 17, 2014	March 17, 2015
6	18	June 16, 2015	March 15, 2016
7	13	June 6, 2016	September 5, 2016

== Episodes ==
=== Season 1 (2010) ===
No. overall	No. in season	Title	Directed by	Written by	Original release date	Prod. code	US viewers (millions)
1	1	"See One. Do One. Teach One."	Michael M. Robin	Janet Tamaro	July 12, 2010	296014	7.55
Detective Jane Rizzoli and Chief Medical Examiner Maura Isles investigate the murder of a husband and wife in their prestigious home. The signature points to the methods of Charles Hoyt, a medical school drop-out and serial killer who also stalked and traumatized Jane and seriously injured both of her hands. Although he was caught, convicted and sentenced to life in prison, the team discovers that not only has Hoyt escaped from prison - he has an apprentice. Jane decides to stay at Maura's house until Hoyt and his apprentice are caught and sent to prison.
2	2	"Boston Strangler Redux"	Michael M. Robin	Janet Tamaro	July 19, 2010	2M5451	7.27
In the middle of a baseball game between Boston Police Department and the Drug Unit, a woman's body is dropped onto the field from a nearby bridge. When another strangling victim is found, Korsak notices the two victims have the same names as the first two victims of the Boston Strangler. Korsak is passed over for promotion despite scoring 100% on the sergeant's exam. The unit finds out their new lieutenant is Joey Grant (Donnie Wahlberg). Jane not only grew up with Grant, they went to school together, where their life-long rivalry began.
3	3	"Sympathy for the Devil"	Roxann Dawson	Joel Fields	July 26, 2010	2M5452	6.55
The puzzling death of a healthy Cape Verdian teenage boy appears to be the result of a Pentecostal exorcism. To add to the mystery, he may have belonged to a neighborhood skater gang. All evidence leads Jane to suspect both his pastor and the skater gang in his death. Meanwhile, Jane's mother sets her up on a date with Lt. Grant.
4	4	"She Works Hard for the Money"	Arvin Brown	Dave Caplan	August 2, 2010	2M5453	6.61
Jane and Maura investigate the murder of a BCU (Boston Cambridge University) student, Danielle Davis, who was mysteriously shot on campus. Danielle was attending college on a full soccer scholarship and was a successful student and well-liked by everyone. The apparent suicide of a BCU faculty member is discovered, is quickly ruled as murder, and is associated with Davis' murder.
5	5	"Money for Nothing"	Nelson McCormick	Dave Caplan & Joel Fields	August 9, 2010	2M5456	7.42
A "floater" pulled from the Boston Harbor turns out to be the eldest brother of a Boston Brahmin family. Maura's personal connection with the family creates tension between her and Jane. Meanwhile, Angela has begun selling a "youth promoting" Polynesian health drink which Maura analyzes in the lab with not-so-surprising results.
6	6	"I Kissed a Girl"	Michael Zinberg	Alison Cross	August 16, 2010	2M5455	6.49
When Jane and Maura are called in on the case of a dead woman in an alley, Jane and Frost both talk about investigating the husband, but Maura finds that the victim is a lesbian and married to a woman.
7	7	"Born to Run"	Matt Penn	David Gould	August 23, 2010	2M5454	6.73
The Homicide Division gets a new boss, Lt. Sean Cavanaugh (Brian Goodman). While running the Massachusetts Marathon for charity, Jane & Maura are put under pressure to "quietly" solve the unwitnessed shooting deaths of two young men. During the clandestine investigation, they discover there is an intended third victim and also learn who the murderer is after discovering the murders are connected to a rape 15 years earlier. The pressure is on to prevent the leak of these past and future incidents to both the press and the half-million participants and spectators in order to avoid a dangerous mass panic episode.
8	8	"I'm Your Boogie Man"	Mark Haber	Janet Tamaro	August 30, 2010	2M5457	6.42
Jane's life is in danger again by imprisoned serial killer Charles Hoyt and this time, not only does he have another apprentice, it is a real plot twist as to whom it is.
9	9	"The Beast in Me"	Adam Arkin	Karina Csolty	September 6, 2010	2M5458	7.24
The death of a young man leads to Maura finding out more about her biological father, who is not who or what she expected him to be.
10	10	"When the Gun Goes Bang, Bang, Bang"	Michael M. Robin	Janet Tamaro	September 13, 2010	2M5459	6.56
When an undercover drug control cop is killed working a homicide case, the only witness is a crack addict. While all the other cops are on the street looking for the killers, and Jane is interviewing the witness back at headquarters, the killers invade the building, shooting the policeman at the desk, and Frankie in the hallway. Angela is throwing a surprise party for Jane's younger brother's release from prison and Jane and Frankie refuse to attend.

=== Season 2 (2011) ===
No. overall	No. in season	Title	Directed by	Written by	Original release date	Prod. code	US viewers (millions)
11	1	"We Don't Need Another Hero"	Michael Zinberg	Janet Tamaro	July 11, 2011	2M5601	6.38
Three months after the shooting at the precinct, Jane is ready to get back to work, but has to wait for a doctor to sign off that she is ready for duty. At an award ceremony for officers who showed extraordinary efforts in the line of duty, Jane begins bonding with a fellow recipient, Abby, but after the award ceremony is over, Abby's car explodes. Meanwhile, Angela and Frank are getting divorced and someone from Jane's past returns.
12	2	"Living Proof"	Bethany Rooney	Dee Johnson	July 18, 2011	2M5602	6.39
A dead surrogate at a day spa leads to a search for the baby's biological parents. The woman's husband is the prime suspect in the murder, but when a lawyer (Dylan Neal) posing as a doctor also ends up dead, Jane and Maura realize the man was framed and must find the real killer before the baby's life is in danger.
13	3	"Sailor Man"	Michael Zinberg	Joel Fields	July 25, 2011	2M5603	6.04
A woman's body is found during Fleet Week; Frost has a tense visit with his father. Angela's car needs repairing.
14	4	"Brown Eyed Girl"	Mark Haber	Julie Hébert	August 1, 2011	2M5607	6.45
The daughter of Jane's former partner is kidnapped in front of the daughter's brother. They race against the clock to find the missing girl after another girl who resembles her is found dead.
15	5	"Don't Hate the Player"	Holly Dale	David Gould & Janet Tamaro	August 8, 2011	2M5604	6.46
Rizzoli and Isles investigate the seemingly accidental death of a baseball coach, who apparently fell in the locker room shower amid a power struggle over the team; Jane's brother gets out of prison.
16	6	"Rebel Without a Pause"	Nelson McCormick	Elizabeth Benjamin & Janet Tamaro	August 15, 2011	2M5605	6.74
Maura's knowledge of American history becomes useful when a garbage man is killed while participating in a Revolutionary War re-enactment; Maura's mother visits.
17	7	"Bloodlines"	Michael Zinberg	Elizabeth Benjamin & Dee Johnson	August 22, 2011	2M5606	6.27
Jane and Maura investigate the death of a woman who was burned at the stake. At the victim's house Jane, Korsak, and Frost find an altar, and a skull, meaning that Helen was a witch. They also find she owned three acres of land, and has genealogies since 1692. Korsak and Frost investigate the man who was getting the spell cast on him. When an old girlfriend of Frankie's shows up, Jane is suspicious of her motives.
18	8	"My Own Worst Enemy"	Terrence O'Hara	Joel Fields & Emilia Serrano	August 29, 2011	2M5608	6.71
When Maura is a no-show at a double shooting, where a father is killed but his son survives, Jane is worried. Later, at the autopsy on a street junkie, Jane is irritated when Maura is secretive over some texts she is receiving. Korsak and Frost find that the victim who survived has an uncle, who was let out of prison six weeks ago.
19	9	"Gone Daddy Gone"	Fred Toye	David Gould & Dee Johnson	September 5, 2011	2M5609	6.69
The unit is called in on the case of a car with no victim, with blood spattered all over the inside. When the body eventually washes up, Maura is dismayed to see she was killed with an ice pick, the signature of her biological father, Paddy Doyle and recuses herself from the autopsy. Korsak tells Jane that she needs to go to sensitivity training, but she wants to avoid it at all cost.
20	10	"Remember Me"	Randy Zisk	David J. North & Janet Tamaro	September 12, 2011	2M5610	5.63
When a prison inmate is murdered, Jane and Maura discover that Hoyt is in the prison infirmary, receiving treatment for cancer, and he has offered to give Jane information on murders that he has done years ago. But, when he presents them as a riddle, Maura believes that the cancer has spread to his brain and he doesn't know what he's saying. Meanwhile, Maura is having trouble deciding on a birthday present for Jane while she and Angela try to plan a surprise party for her.
21	11	"Can I Get a Witness?"	Andy Wolk	Janet Tamaro & Elizabeth Benjamin	November 28, 2011	2M5611	4.78
Jane and Korsak are preparing Dante Moore, who witnessed the murder of a community activist as a teenager, to testify in the trial against gang leader Little T, who was charged in the murder. However, Dante inexplicably flees his motel room the night before the trial and is found murdered the next morning.
22	12	"He Ain't Heavy, He's My Brother"	Steve Robin	David Gould & Dee Johnson	December 5, 2011	2M5612	3.86
Maura throws a goodbye party for Tommy since he has gotten a new apartment and is moving out of her house. The next day a bank is robbed and a man is gunned down as the killer is about to leave. When the van that was used in the robbery is found, the dead body of one of the robbers is in it, along with fingerprints matching Tommy, who is arrested.
23	13	"Seventeen Ain't So Sweet"	Rod Holcomb	Shelley Meals & Darin Goldberg	December 12, 2011	2M5613	4.91
When Casey is unable to go with Jane to her high school reunion, Maura steps in. At the reunion, Jane is asked by the husband of her high school best friend, Steve Sanner, to call him later. Later that evening, Jane and Maura are called to the high school football field to investigate a murder, and Jane is shocked to see the victim is Steve.
24	14	"Don't Stop Dancing, Girl"	Mark Haber	Story by : David Gould & Janet Tamaro; Teleplay by : Janet Tamaro	December 19, 2011	2M5614	5.32
Jane and Maura are on the case when a Dance Mom, Denise Ryan, is killed when she is stabbed in the chest with scissors. Maura finds that their victim has had extensive surgery on her face. Korsak's ex-wife calls and tells him that his stepson has been arrested for the shooting of a cop.
25	15	"Burning Down the House"	Michael Zinberg	Janet Tamaro	December 26, 2011	2M5615	5.79
Jane and Maura are on the case of a firefighter killed in a fire. When the death looks suspicious, Maura declares it a murder. When Maura orders the fire reports for the unit, she becomes the next target of the killer.

=== Season 3 (2012) ===
No. overall	No. in season	Title	Directed by	Written by	Original release date	Prod. code	US viewers (millions)
26	1	"What Doesn't Kill You"	Michael Katleman	Janet Tamaro	June 5, 2012	2M5901	5.62
Maura's father, Paddy Doyle, is in critical condition, and Maura and Jane's relationship is in trouble. IAB is also starting an investigation about what happened. They investigate Jane until a cop is murdered and they have a new case. Maura is faced with the decision of signing a DNR for her father. While all this is happening to her biological father, her adoptive mother is still in the hospital from being hit by the car.
27	2	"Dirty Little Secrets"	Aaron Lipstadt	Steve Lichtman & Kiersten Van Home	June 12, 2012	2M5902	5.13
Jane's dad returns with the surprise that he's getting married. But to get married he must get Angela to sign an annulment, which she won't sign. Jane and Maura work the case of a yoga student who was killed. The yoga student was also a geology major who discovered illegal activity by Sensei Matta (Rick Ravanello), the person who owns the yoga company.
28	3	"This Is How a Heart Breaks"	Steve Robin	David Gould & Sal Calleros	June 19, 2012	2M5903	5.36
Jane investigates the death of an ex-serviceman living on the streets demonstrating classic PTSD symptoms. When a friend of the victim, another ex-serviceman, and a documentary film maker are found dead, killed by the same weapon as the first victim Jane must find out why. Maura and Jane save the life of a man brought into the morgue by performing a tracheotomy.
29	4	"Welcome to the Dollhouse"	Mark Haber	Russell J. Grant & Janet Tamaro	June 26, 2012	2M5904	5.43
Jane and Maura are on the case of a killer who dresses his victims as 1980s dolls. Korsak finds a dog that turns out to be a dog for soldiers with PTSD, the dog works at the same place that Casey works at. When Maura brings the dog back she realizes what is wrong with Casey, and why he doesn't want to see Jane.
30	5	"Throwing Down the Gauntlet"	Jamie Babbit	Antoinette Stella & Janet Tamaro	July 3, 2012	2M5905	5.32
Rizzoli and Isles are on the case of a law student who was killed and dumped into a trash bin. Maura has found the identity of her biological mother, Dr. Hope Martin (Sharon Lawrence), but doesn't want to tell that she is her daughter, since Hope was told Maura died at birth. But when Maura is in need of a technique that Dr. Martin developed for fingerprinting corpses, Jane calls her in to help. Angela gets into politics when she starts supporting a new candidate for mayor, Tom MacGregor, Jr., who helps school lunches.
31	6	"Money Maker"	Greg Beeman	Story by : David Sonnenborn & Janet Tamaro; Teleplay by : Janet Tamaro	July 10, 2012	2M5906	5.51
Maura sets up a dinner date with Hope and her daughter, but soon is having second thoughts. Jane and Maura are called on the case of a right ear that is stuck to the house; they find that the victim who belongs to the ear in the trash can. Frost and Jane find out that he was running an underground sex party, and that the night Neal was murdered there was a party at that house.
32	7	"Crazy for You"	Fred Toye	Antoinette Stella & Lindsay Sturman	July 17, 2012	2M5907	5.84
When two psychiatrists, husband and wife, are murdered, suspicions first fall on opponents of the wife's position supporting childless marriage. Frost and Korsak run into a brick wall when they try to get a search warrant for the psychiatrists' records. Maura gets a lot of assistance (some of it unwanted) from attendees at the "Bullet and Blast Injuries" conference: Dr. Higgins from Texas, Dr. Papov from Russia, and her arrogant subordinate Dr. Pike. Angela is rear-ended by Lydia, who turns out to be her ex-husband's on-again off-again fiancée, who also happens to have slept with Jane's younger brother, Tommy.
33	8	"Cuts Like a Knife"	Randy Zisk	David Gould & Sal Calleros	July 24, 2012	2M5908	5.59
Jane and Maura are called to a wedding chapel, where the bride entered for her walk down the aisle with her throat slashed, collapsed, and died. They soon find she had a sister, now missing -- the top tier of the wedding cake is also gone. They soon find the cake, in the possession of the groom's deranged ex-fiancée. Frankie hits it off with Jane's new neighbor, Riley.
34	9	"Home Town Glory"	Milan Cheylov	Janet Tamaro	July 31, 2012	2M5909	4.44
Shane, a childhood friend of Frankie and Jane, is found murdered in a sketchy part of town, known for drug dealing. The alienated father, the abusive former manager of the three brothers' band, is the primary suspect. But tests show Shane hadn't used drugs in six months. Still not aware of just who Lydia is, Angela is throwing her a baby shower.
35	10	"Melt My Heart to Stone"	Michael Katleman	Story by : Russell J. Grant & Janet Tamaro; Teleplay by : Janet Tamaro	August 14, 2012	2M5910	6.04
Two people return, and neither is who they originally appeared to be. Riley, the drug dealer (Ep 3.8) turns out to be an undercover detective from the drug unit, who has gotten the promotion Frankie was hoping for. Dennis, the man Jane and Maura revived in the morgue (Ep 3.3) has returned after dumping Maura three months before after some hot and heavy dating. The latest victim of a serial killer turns up encased in plaster as a new statue in the fountain at the art museum. Lydia goes into labor in the station coffee shop.
36	11	"Class Action Satisfaction"	Norman Buckley	Antoinette Stella & Lindsay Sturman	November 27, 2012	2M5911	3.44
While Angela is serving a customer he begins coughing up blood and dies in the coffee shop. Korsak's name and number are found in his wallet. Maura determines the case of death was warfarin overdose, which the victim had NOT been prescribed, and is also used as rat poison. Investigating why Korsak's number was found in his wallet, they find Korsak's first ex-wife, who gave the name and number to him. Maura takes a cheek swab from Lydia's baby, which she dumped at Maura's, to determine who the baby's father is. Lydia shows up with her brassy mother and reclaims the baby.
37	12	"Love the Way You Lie"	Mark Harber	Steve Lichtman & David Gould	December 4, 2012	2M5912	4.75
Jane, Korsak and Frost catch a case of a high-profile suicide, that of a famous author. But Maura finds the ligature marks on his neck inconsistent with suicide and declares it a suspicious death. Frost crosses paths with an old case, one where he was not entirely convinced the suspect was guilty. Lt. Cavanaugh has decreed that the Homicide Squad is taking part in "A Week of Health", which means, among other things, no coffee, drafting Angela, Maura, and a very reluctant Jane as "wellness" captains. Jane finds that Angela has been dating Cavanaugh.
38	13	"Virtual Love"	Steve Robin	Story by : Sam Lembeck & Sal Calleros; Teleplay by : Sal Calleros & Janet Tamaro	December 11, 2012	2M5913	3.79
After an alcohol brewer is stabbed with a weapon that's out of the normal, Jane and Maura are sent on the case to find the killer. Jane begins worrying about her mother when she finds that Angela is trying to make Cavanaugh jealous by flirting with other men in front of him. Rondo asks Jane, Maura, Korsak and Frost to mentor some teens who are in a shelter to see if they can show them they can have a better life, only for one of the teens to pull the fire alarm and steal Angela's wallet.
39	14	"Over/Under"	Paul Holohan	Story by : Russell J. Grant & Janet Tamaro; Teleplay by : Janet Tamaro	December 18, 2012	2M5914	3.42
Maura and Jane are called into the case of a man who was stabbed in the throat in the middle of a car wash. They find that the murder victim was a former football star who lost his career when a player slipped and fell and now owns a bakery with all of his ex-girlfriends. Jane, Korsak, and Frost are at practice for the baseball finals, Frost's mom, roommate, and roommate's son come to visit Frost.
40	15	"No More Drama In My Life"	Michael Katleman	Janet Tamaro	December 25, 2012	2M5915	4.42
Jane and Maura are on the case of an actor who was shot and killed from a prop gun and work to find out who would load the gun with real bullets. Hope returns and tries to salvage her relationship with Maura after finding out she was her daughter, and to see if she's still willing to donate her kidney to Cailin, only to find out that Maura doesn't want anything to do with her.

=== Season 4 (2013–14) ===
No. overall	No. in season	Title	Directed by	Written by	Original release date	Prod. code	US viewers (millions)
41	1	"We Are Family"	Michael Katleman	Janet Tamaro	June 25, 2013	2M6251	6.64
A state senator is killed by a sniper's bullet while riding in a parade. The only clue is that during the hour and a half of time unaccounted for just before the parade, she had blueberry waffles for breakfast somewhere. Isles is upset that she donated her kidney to Cailin three months ago and has yet to be thanked for it. She and Rizzoli get caught spying on Cailin, who gives Isles an heirloom from Paddy Doyle. Now recovered from his spinal surgery, Casey returns to Rizzoli's life. However, he tells her that he is returning to Afghanistan to help in the soldiers' therapy there.
42	2	"In Over Your Head"	Jamie Babbit	Russell J. Grant & Janet Tamaro	July 2, 2013	2M6252	5.90
An investigative journalism student is found dead on the beach. The cause of death is determined as a drowning, but her lungs contain freshwater and not the ocean's saltwater. The student had been investigating a drug ring at her university. Jane must grudgingly work with a former colleague, who is now a new drug-unit lieutenant, in order to solve the case. Elsewhere, Maura learns that her mother Hope received a sizable donation to open her charity clinic. The donor was Paddy Doyle. He is asked to give his statement about how he got the money, so the FBI will leave Hope alone, but he refuses.
43	3	"But I Am a Good Girl"	Norman Buckley	Story by : Y. Shireen Razack; Teleplay by : Janet Tamaro	July 9, 2013	2M6255	5.58
At T.J.'s christening, Lydia's new fiance shows up, and Maura finds the body of a young woman in the baptismal font. Despite the killer's efforts to make the job of identifying her difficult, the detectives discover she's the daughter of a local clothing factory worker and that she bought a pregnancy test. She also has a very recent tattoo that indicates she's "owned" by a local gang. Lydia's fiance plans to move his new family to Abilene, Texas, and since Tommy never filed his custody paperwork, Jane tries to get Lydia and Tommy "together". Announced cuts at BPD have everyone nervous.
44	4	"Killer in High Heels"	Mark Haber	Charlie Craig & Ken Hanes	July 16, 2013	2M6253	5.22
Maura is arrested after her date at a charity event turns up dead. She has no memory of the date until she gets roughed up in jail by a woman who thought Maura was responsible for her arrest. Maura remembers her date blowing a hallucinogen at her, putting her in a trance. Because her guard has ties to Paddy Doyle, she is allowed to use the jail's computers to help find the real killer.
45	5	"Dance with the Devil"	Jamie Babbit	Story by : Lisa Marie Petersen; Teleplay by : Janet Tamaro	July 23, 2013	2M6254	5.49
In 1993, Paddy Doyle was responsible for the death of Lt. Cavanaugh's wife and child. Arson Detective Calvin Ghetts, who died recently, has been connected to Doyle, causing the court to consider letting him out on bond. Frost, Maura and Jane find photos in the exhaust pipe of a confiscated vehicle, which leads Maura to talk to Hope as the photos connect her to Doyle. She had helped bandage Doyle after he set Cavanaugh's apartment on fire.
46	6	"Somebody's Watching Me"	Milan Cheylov	Lisa Marie Petersen & Ken Hanes	July 30, 2013	2M6256	5.33
A sanitation worker is killed while dropping off items to an eccentric collector. The collector is a conspiracy theorist who had constructed a makeshift EMP device that disabled a drone, which had flown too close to the neighborhood, subsequently knocking out the power. The worker was mistakenly killed by a man who worked for the drone's company because the collector had salvaged parts from the drone. Jane accidentally spills hot coffee on a woman, who sues her for damages.
47	7	"All for One"	Paul Holohan	Janet Tamaro	August 6, 2013	2M6257	5.50
David Sutton (Chris Tallman), a high school driver's education/science teacher, is killed by a hit-and-run driver. The car used is from his own class. A fiber from what is believed to be from a friendship bracelet is found inside. When Samantha Cole (Alexis Raich), Sutton's chemistry student, attempts a drug overdose before his death, her background is checked. The team learns she had a tightly knit circle of friends and that Sutton was exchanging grades for sex.
48	8	"Cold As Ice"	Randy Zisk	Lisa Marie Petersen & Ken Hanes	August 13, 2013	2M6258	5.60
Dr. Carla Dalton (Laura Niemi) is killed in the parking garage near a boys' hockey game. The weapon used is identified as a skate hook for tightening laces, and Carla's car is found dumped in the river. She was in Boston trying to track down her nephew Todd, who had Huntington's disease. Cailin shows up at Maura's, asking to stay with her while Hope is out of town, even though a sitter was left in charge.
49	9	"No One Mourns the Wicked"	Steve Robin	Story by : Ken Hanes & Lisa Marie Petersen; Teleplay by : Janet Tamaro	August 20, 2013	2M6259	5.61
Jane and Maura are asked by forensic psychiatrist Dr. Victoria Nolan (Jessica Tuck) to speak at a law enforcement symposium. Nolan is on a tour for her book, Three Faces of Evil, which is about serial killers, one of whom is Charles Hoyt (Michael Massee). A crime scene depicting Hoyt's murders is staged. As Jane and Maura move to describe the "victims", they see that the forensic dummies are real corpses. The victims, past and present, have been branded with the Rod of Asclepius symbol.
50	10	"Built for Speed"	Anthony Hardwick	Russell J. Grant & Matt MacLeod	August 27, 2013	2M6260	6.00
Alberto Santana (Michael Galante) dies when his street racer explodes during a race after he turns on the car's nitrous oxide. Giovanni Gilberti (Matthew Del Negro) uses his phone to record the events. Also the video from memory card of the car's camera was restored. Upon review of these videos, the team spots Detective Martinez in the crowd. Maura and B.T. Cerrone (Eric Winter), a bomb technician, realize the nitrous had been swapped out for propane and find a detonator. To complicate matters, the team learns that the other car from the race was used in drug running. Jane fears their investigation will be impeded by the drug case.
51	11	"Judge, Jury & Executioner"	Mark Haber	Y. Shireen Razack & Jill Goldsmith	September 3, 2013	2M6261	5.88
Judge Kathleen Harper (A'da Alison Woolfolk) collapses and dies at her daughter Ashley's (Jazz Raycole) mock trial presentation, despite fellow Judge Roger Thorson's (Doug Savant) attempt to revive her. Maura's initial examination reveals a paint smudge and a scratch on Harper's hand and a needle puncture on her neck. Her purse and its scattered contents are found in a nearby recently painted stairwell. The autopsy shows Harper died from toxic levels of Ritalin in her bloodstream, more than what she was taking for narcolepsy. Tommy anonymously pays Angela's back taxes, using his settlement from the parking garage.
52	12	"Partners in Crime"	Randy Zisk	Linda McGibney & Janet Tamaro	September 10, 2013	2M6262	5.70
The team has two homicides which, at first, seem unrelated. Mark Cabot is killed in the parking garage of a fitness club. Rhonda Clark (Celia Finkelstein) is drowned in her hot tub. A german shepherd's hair is found in Rhonda's lungs, believed to be from the killer's dog. Paddy Doyle asks Maura to take care of his paroled father, Patrick (Richard Herd), but Patrick wants nothing to do with her. Casey returns home and tells Jane he has been made a full colonel and he must now decide to stay in the service to be a general or retire and marry her.
53	13	"Tears of a Clown"	Michael Katleman	Story by : Ken Hanes & Matt MacLeod; Teleplay by : Ken Hanes, Matt MacLeod & Janet Tamaro	February 25, 2014	2M6263	3.73
The "Summer of the Clown", a 1988 case where a person dressed as a clown kidnapped young boys, is revisited, when similar events recur. Meanwhile, Jane and Casey are torn between their respective careers and their own relationship, and Maura tries to help Frost's relationship by offering his girlfriend some career advice regarding a job in Beijing.
54	14	"Just Push Play"	Kate Woods	Story by : Linda McGibney & Sam Lembeck; Teleplay by : Linda McGibney & Janet Tamaro	March 4, 2014	2M6264	3.35
The team investigates an aspiring gifted singer-songwriter's death at a bar. They learn the woman spent some time in rehab, where they discover her roommate stole her original songs, got signed by a music label and killed her to cover it up. After being away for a year, Frank Rizzoli (Chazz Palminteri) returns to announce he has prostate cancer. Although concerned for his health, his family has difficulty putting his past mistreatment behind them.
55	15	"Food for Thought"	Steve Clancy	Story by : Jill Goldsmith & Y. Shireen Razack; Teleplay by : Janet Tamaro	March 11, 2014	2M6265	4.74
A famous chef and restaurateur dies, and Maura detects he was poisoned. The team recalls the chef recently won a televised cooking competition and that his competitors work for him. One of them resented the chef's fame and wanted to capitalize on expanding the business. Meanwhile, Maura's mother, Hope, tells her that she is closing her clinics, which were funded by Paddy Doyle. She hopes this will mend the rift with Maura and the two can get to know each other. This marks Lee Thompson Young’s final appearance on the show as Barry Frost, as he died on August 19, 2013, during the middle of the filming of the show’s fourth season.
56	16	"You're Gonna Miss Me When I'm Gone"	Norman Buckley	Janet Tamaro	March 18, 2014	2M6266	3.58
A senator's daughter, who works for the government, is murdered. She is thought to have been fleeing the country with government secrets, putting the BPD at odds with Homeland Security. The woman, however, leaves digital clues that her boss had raped her and will kill her to keep her quiet. Meanwhile, Jane accepts Casey's proposal, since he agrees to retire from the military. Later, though, Jane changes her mind when he takes a job in the Balkans. Maura senses something more, and Jane reveals that she may be pregnant.

=== Season 5 (2014–15) ===
No. overall	No. in season	Title	Directed by	Written by	Original release date	Prod. code	US viewers (millions)
57	1	"A New Day"	Michael Katleman	Michael Sardo	June 17, 2014	2M6551	5.81
A woman is stabbed to death while jogging in a park. The investigation is stepped up when an empty baby stroller, believed to have contained her baby, is found nearby. The baby's father, the woman's ex-husband, is questioned, but claims he was stuck in traffic with his girlfriend at the time of death. Frankie and Maura decide they are too much like family to pursue a relationship; Jane deals with morning sickness while unsuccessfully trying to hide her pregnancy from her mother. The team is called to a car accident that claimed the life of Detective Frost.
58	2	"...Goodbye"	Steve Robin	Jan Nash	June 24, 2014	2M6552	5.50
While the team deals with their grief in order to make arrangements for Frost's funeral, a young woman with amnesia wearing bloody clothing walks into the precinct holding a gun and stating she might have killed someone.
59	3	"Too Good to Be True"	Mark Haber	Ken Hanes	July 1, 2014	2M6553	5.43
Loners, who would not be missed for extended periods of time, are interviewed to work on a farm. Unfortunately, those hired are killed by the disgruntled son of a bankrupt farmer, which culminates in a tense shoot-out that puts Jane and her unborn child at risk. she finally confirms to her mother of her pregnancy, which Angela already knew, and accepts Maura's help, which comes with constant prenatal advice.
60	4	"Doomsday"	Kevin Dowling	Katie Wech	July 8, 2014	2M6554	5.13
A survivalist is believed to have died from halomethane poisoning in his protective fallout shelter, until Maura deems the death "suspicious" since alternative methods to the gas exist today. The team investigates the victim's means of survival if he were to have exited the shelter after a catastrophe. Angela asks Jane to find out why Frankie is being secretive, but Jane wishes to know the same about Korsak.
61	5	"The Best Laid Plans"	Christine Moore	Alicia Kirk	July 15, 2014	2M6555	4.86
A wealthy woman with terminal cancer prepares to commit suicide but is killed before she is able to do so. The team investigates her family and staff, both past and present. since Maura must teach a college forensic science class, Angela becomes responsible for Jane, who considers her mother's help as meddling. Maura then takes a liking to a professor but remains cautious, due to her luck with men. Also, the void left at Frost's desk forces the team to make a decision.
62	6	"Knockout"	Paul Holahan	Russell J. Grant & Michael Sardo	July 22, 2014	2M6556	5.23
Judith Barnett, a woman who recently lost a lot of weight, is stabbed to death in her home. Their handyman, Luis Benitez's knife is found near her body. With Maura at a convention, the team must rely on her Assistant ME Susie Chang (Tina Huang) to use her quirky methods to help find the murderer. Korsak reminisces about the death of an old musician friend, whose grandson has contacted him to play some of their music.
63	7	"Boston Keltic"	Kate Woods	Blair Singer	July 29, 2014	2M6557	4.77
The mysterious murder of a used-book dealer leads to one suspect with ties to Paddy Doyle. When Jane questions Paddy about the case, he requests to see Maura, who agrees upon learning he is being transferred to a California maximum-security prison. Angela decides to start fresh with her life, which includes breaking up with Lt. Cavanaugh and quitting her job at the café.
64	8	"Lost & Found"	Randy Zisk	Jan Nash & Michael Sardo	August 5, 2014	2M6558	5.09
When a young woman is murdered by a contract killer, Jane must put herself at risk to save a teenaged witness, named Tasha, as the team scrambles to find her. Korsak adds crime scene analyst Nina Holiday (Idara Victor) to his team.
65	9	"It Takes a Village"	Michael Katleman	Ken Hanes & Jan Nash	August 12, 2014	2M6559	5.68
The team investigates the poisoning death of a woman found mummified in a wine cellar. It is revealed that two different people in two different occasions had discovered the body and failed to report it to the police due to their own personal relationships with the victim. While Jane recovers at the hospital from her wounds sustained in protecting Tasha, she learns that she lost the baby and that Tasha will be placed in a group home upon leaving the hospital.
66	10	"Phoenix Rising"	Mark Haber	Russell J. Grant & Alicia Kirk	August 19, 2014	2M6560	5.21
An old friend of Korsak's dying in prison asks him to solve the case that put him there – the deaths of his wife and daughter killed in a house fire 15 years earlier. His surviving son blames him for the deaths and has not spoken to him in years. Angela secretly keeps the letter that clears Jane to return to work from her.
67	11	"If You Can't Stand the Heat"	Steve Clancy	Diana Mendez & Sam Lembeck	August 26, 2014	2M6561	5.16
When tenants complain of water leaks, a landlord finds the body of a man half-submerged in a bathtub. Initially, it is believed Richard Nelson did so to escape the sweltering heat outside. During autopsy, Maura discovers Nelson died of strangulation. His financials reveal him to be a millionaire. Angela drinks some "special" tea to stay cool, but it has aphrodisiacal side effects. Korsak looks for the owner of a lost dog.
68	12	"Burden of Proof" (Part 1 of 2)"	Norman Buckley	Katie Wech	September 2, 2014	2M6562	5.04
A county prosecutor appears to be framed for a murder, but proving his innocence puts Jane in danger. Angela takes it upon herself to teach Maura about children's interest when she learns Maura is to meet Jack's 12-year-old daughter.
69	13	"Bridge to Tomorrow" (Part 2 of 2)"	Ed Ornelas	Ken Hanes	February 17, 2015	2M6563	3.58
After Jane saves Paul, the prosecutor, when he slips off a bridge, the squad resumes searching for the real killer. Angela asks Frankie for help in preparing for a restaurant-manager job interview. Korsak reveals he bought the local bar ("The Dirty Robber") as a retirement present to himself.
70	14	"Foot Loose"	Christine Moore	Michael Sardo	February 24, 2015	2M6564	2.86
Jane and Maura investigate the death of a victim that they can't identify, as the only body part that was found is a foot. When another body part is found in the beach, the team finds a relation between them that leads to a Doctor attempting to use sound therapy to heal his patients. Angela, who is frustrated with not being able to find a job, ends up getting a job at the bar, by giving advice to a man about proposing to his girlfriend and the woman who delivers the beer.
71	15	"Gumshoe"	Greg Prange	Ron McGee	March 3, 2015	2M6565	3.51
The owner of Mamaki Clothing (an environmentally friendly line) is thrown from his business' balcony, but his death occurred before that. The offices reveal a burglary, in which only files are taken. Corporate espionage is the apparent motive. However, the owner's wife also goes missing, and the team finds themselves working with a private detective who had been caught snooping by the victim just before his death. Maura cautions Angela about spending her new income but Angela uncovers Maura's own spending habits. Frankie fails the shooting test twice due to his interest in the shooting instructor and asks Jane for help focusing.
72	16	"In Plain View"	Mark Haber	Russell J. Grant	March 10, 2015	2M6566	3.12
After his wife reports him missing, Todd Reynolds is found beaten to death outside his seemingly disabled vehicle. After questioning his son Logan, the team searches for a man Todd was heard arguing with, two days ago. Maine Detective Mike Guthrie (Niall Matter) arrives to suggest they are looking for the same person who killed a "stranded" 60-year-old woman. Maura becomes a victim of identity theft.
73	17	"Bite Out of Crime"	Steve Robin	Alicia Kirk & Katie Wech	March 17, 2015	2M6567	3.39
While the team investigates a string of sniper attacks in Franklin Park, Maura must elicit a statement from an injured witness believed to be having a psychotic break, to the extent that he believes himself to be a werewolf. The sniper kills the first victim and injures the second one. Maura also must cope with her ending her relationship with Jack who is re-locating to New Mexico to be close to his daughter after his ex-wife got a job with NASA.
74	18	"Family Matters"	Michael Katleman	Jan Nash	March 17, 2015	2M6568	3.62
A man dies while role playing with his wife in a Boston hotel room. His death appears to result from a fall, but the physics of the fall make it impossible. The detectives find out that the murdered man was a bigamist, having two wives in two different states. Tasha (Ep 5.8, Lost & Found) is applying at several colleges and wants to get accepted on her own merit, not Maura's pulling strings. BCU, Maura's fictional alma mater Boston Cambridge University, accepts, but their offer of financial aid is insufficient. When Maura learns this, she works with Korsak and the team to help Tasha attend by awarding her the newly created Barry Frost Memorial Scholarship.

=== Season 6 (2015–16) ===
Beginning in episode 7, a sub-plot is woven in where someone is after Jane, starting with torching her apartment; it climaxes in a 3-parter that spans episodes 6.18 - 7.2.

No. overall	No. in season	Title	Directed by	Written by	Original release date	Prod. code	US viewers (millions)
75	1	"The Platform"	Greg Prange	Jan Nash	June 16, 2015	2M6951	4.39
The body of a young woman is found inside a dumpster and the detectives try to interview her boyfriend Spike, a suspect in her murder. The pursuit of Spike in a subway station leads Frankie to kill a man found unarmed, triggering an Internal Affairs investigation. Closer investigation by the team reveals that the man indeed had a gun that was removed from the scene by somebody that is ultimately linked to the crime. Frankie has moved into a new apartment, as Angela tries to rid herself of an unsightly family chair. Maura welcomes Kent Drake, a new apprentice who served in Afghanistan, onto her staff.
76	2	"Bassholes"	Chad Lowe	Michael Sardo	June 23, 2015	2M6952	4.01
The death of a bass fisherman on his boat during a tournament lures the team into a murder investigation. The victim, a professor of poetry who didn't get tenure, has competed and won various fishing competitions. His competitors were convinced that he was cheating, but during the investigation it's revealed that many of them also cheated. Frankie loses a bet to Korsak and is forced to take care of a bag of flour and carry it as a baby for a day.
77	3	"Deadly Harvest"	Mark Haber	Ken Hanes	June 30, 2015	2M6955	4.27
A couple's bodies are found at a BCU body farm matching the description of married hippies who had been missing for a year. The team investigates the possibility of the woman being held captive before her death, which leads them to saving another victim. Despite being uncoordinated, is Angela taking ice skating lessons.
78	4	"Imitation Game" (Part 1 of 2)"	Steve Robin	Katie Wech	July 7, 2015	2M6953	4.42
A family in a minivan bumps into the rear of truck with a refrigerator strapped in the back. The fridge opens and the body of a man falls into the van, sending everyone in the vicinity into a panic. When Maura runs the victim's prints through the database, it alerts the FBI. The man was a most-wanted criminal wanted by the federal agency, the agent suspects that whatever brought the man to Boston was definitively big. Fibers covered in paint recovered from the victim's body send Maura and Jane to the Boston Museum of Art. Although the Museum director insisted that nothing was stolen, the team discovers that a 20 million dollar painting was swapped for a replica.
79	5	"Misconduct" (Part 2 of 2)"	Kate Woods	Ron McGee	July 14, 2015	2M6954	4.12
A friend's death leads to a police investigation into all cases they worked on.
80	6	"Face Value"	Steve Clancy	Story by : Alicia Kirk; Teleplay by : Sam Lembeck	July 21, 2015	2M6956	4.16
Elliot Dutton witnesses a woman being stabbed to death, only he cannot describe the killer due to having prosopagnosia, the inability to recognize faces. Angela's cousin, Carlo, visits the Rizzolis.
81	7	"A Bad Seed Grows"	Christine Moore	Russell J. Grant	July 28, 2015	2M6957	4.40
Out for a jog, a woman finds a dead teenager's body in cage. The team fears this was only the beginning for the killer. Maura and Angela try to get Jane a new couch as an early birthday present, but she (almost) resists it.
82	8	"Nice to Meet You, Dr. Isles"	Norman Buckley	Jan Nash & Michael Sardo	August 4, 2015	2M6958	4.23
A jeweler for celebrities is murdered, Maura's estranged father visits her, and the two instances might be related.
83	9	"Love Taps"	Pete Kowalski	Story by : Dan Hamamura; Teleplay by : Ron McGee & Dan Hamamura	August 11, 2015	2M6959	4.33
A college student is murdered, which leads Jane and Maura to discover his life as an online boyfriend to 32 women.
84	10	"Sister Sister"	Steve Robin	Ken Hanes	August 18, 2015	2M6960	4.52
When a woman is found dead in her pool, her beloved Rottweiler is initially thought to have attacked her. Her daughters then become the main suspects when it's discovered she was poisoned.
85	11	"Fake It 'Til You Make It"	Mark Haber	Katie Wech	August 25, 2015	2M6961	4.59
Both a Boston and a Los Angeles murder victim appear to have similar names and fingerprints, so Jane and Maura visit L.A. Jane's accounts have been hacked, and it seems related with the fire in her apartment.
86	12	"5:26" (Part 1 of 2)"	Greg Prange	Michael Sardo	September 1, 2015	2M6962	4.77
Maura finds Jane's watch with a set time inside a murder victim. In light of recent events surrounding Jane, Korsak takes her off active duty. She must decipher the time's meaning, while the department sets out to solve the murder.
87	13	"Hide and Seek" (Part 2 of 2)"	Kevin G. Cremin	Jan Nash	February 16, 2016	2M6963	2.34
Jane and the rest of the BPD rush to find out who kidnapped Maura from a fake crime scene in the middle of the night and why.
88	14	"Murderjuana"	Norman Buckley	Russel J. Grant	February 16, 2016	2M6964	2.59
A security guard gets wounded while preventing a robbery, killing one of the assailants in the process. A manhunt ensues for the accomplice.
89	15	"Scared to Death"	Mark Haber	Ron McGee	February 23, 2016	2M6965	2.40
Jane investigates the murder of a woman who was part of a fear club. Korsak and Nina find the hacker responsible for Jane's problems, which only raises more questions. Angela finds an engagement ring in Korsak's desk and tells Jane and Maura he is going to propose to Kiki.
90	16	"East Meets West"	Mark Strand	Ken Hanes	March 1, 2016	2M6966	2.43
A death in a suburban gun battle prompts an investigation into an eastern European gang. Maura develops a fever due to exhaustion and Angela and Kent suggest several home remedies.
91	17	"Bomb Voyage"	Jan Nash	Jan Nash & Katie Wech	March 8, 2016	2M6967	3.33
Korsak finds himself in a minefield, after a jogger hears an explosion and finds a severed finger. While the team investigates the victim after saving Korsak, he and Kiki discuss the dangers of the job, causing him to fear she will have doubts about marrying him. Meanwhile, Ron asks Angela to attend a Paris conference with him and Nina finds the woman targeting Jane and Maura only to discover she has been released from jail.
92	18	"A Shot in the Dark"	Greg Prange	Michael Sardo	March 15, 2016	2M6968	2.92
Alice Sands (Annabeth Gish), born into a distinguished law enforcement family, dropped out of the police academy while Jane was enrolled and turned to a life of crime. Her fixation on Jane stems from being second in her class behind Jane, after having been the best at everything prior to then. She turned to running a drug ring, leading to her arrest. Upon release from prison, Alice duped a fellow inmate into leaving with her, but stole her identity and fled to Canada. Meanwhile, Korsak and Kiki's wedding keeps getting delayed by the investigation.

=== Season 7 (2016) ===
No. overall	No. in season	Title	Directed by	Written by	Original release date	Prod. code	US viewers (millions)
93	1	"Two Shots: Move Forward"	Greg Prange	Jan Nash	June 6, 2016	2M7251	3.91
As everyone is leaving the Dirty Robber, after Vince and Kiki finally tie the knot, shots ring out. Nina is shot and Maura sustains a head injury. Jane pursues the shooter, whom she believes is Alice Sands (Annabeth Gish), but Alice gets away, leading to headlines the next day critical of the BPD. Maura appears in the squad room, starts to relate her findings on the available evidence -- and collapses. Korsak delays his retirement out of concern for Jane. Angela breaks up with Ron to protect his family.
94	2	"Dangerous Curve Ahead"	Norman Buckley	Ron McGee	June 6, 2016	2M7252	3.58
Frankie, as the new primary investigator of the Fatal Accident Team, works the case of a young woman killed in a suspicious solo car crash; her parents insist "he killed her", i.e. their daughter was murdered. The "drug unit guys" discover Alice's "money man". They and Korsak and Jane track him to what turns out to be Alice's "cash stash". Unfortunately he's killed before he can be questioned, but Alice is now cut off from her funds. Evidence found on his body leads to Alice's arrest, but her lawyer, Phillip Dayton (Nolan North), gets her released when no physical evidence of Alice's involvement in the shooting is found. Maura is continuing to have memory problems stemming from her head injury.
95	3	"Cops vs. Zombies"	Steve Robin	Katie Wech	June 13, 2016	2M7253	4.00
The team investigates a murder related to a zombie convention. Angela struggles with getting her GED, since she did not graduate from high school because her then-husband did not think it was necessary.
96	4	"Post Mortem"	Mark Haber	Meredith Philpott	June 20, 2016	2M7254	4.13
United States Postal Inspection Service agent CJ Prescott (Yvette Nicole Brown) helps the team investigate the murder of a postal worker. Prescott was already looking into the death of a janitor at the post office and now believes it is all connected to illegal packages of contraband involving the second victim. Maura initially refuses to have surgery for her head injury, despite her lapses in memory. She ultimately makes an appointment.
97	5	"Shadow of Doubt"	Peter B. Kowalski	Ken Hanes	June 27, 2016	2M7255	4.36
A woman dies after tumbling down the stairs in her home. Accidental death is ruled out, so the team must narrow down the suspects among those close to her: the scheming husband, Robert, looking to inherit his wife's fortune; the angry daughter, Claire, who resented her mother for trying to control her love life; and Claire's boyfriend, Gary, resentful for being kept away from Claire. Maura's mother, Hope (Sharon Lawrence), visits her before the surgery; Frankie and Nina make their developing relationship known.
98	6	"There Be Ghosts"	Kevin G. Cremin	Russell J. Grant	July 11, 2016	2M7256	4.14
The investigation into a cancer patient's murder takes a supernatural turn when a legend surfaces that, in 1905, a ghost murdered a doctor who had been unable to save some patients. Maura gets some writing advice from an author (played by the author of the books the series is based on, Tess Gerritsen) who could help establish her in the literary field.
99	7	"Dead Weight"	Stephen Clancy	Jeremy Svenson & Sam Lembeck	July 18, 2016	2M7257	4.05
While Jane is teaching a class at Quantico and dealing with a misogynistic recruit, the rest of the team investigates a spontaneous human combustion case. Angela hunts for her own apartment.
100	8	"2M7258-100"	Angie Harmon	Jan Nash	July 25, 2016	2M7258	3.87
When a possible witness to a double homicide is arrested, Jane goes undercover in prison to get information from her so the team can track down the murderer. After solving the case, Jane inquires about an FBI instructor job that was offered to her while at Quantico. Sharon Gless, known for her role in the 1980s female buddy cop show Cagney & Lacey, appears as a guest star to celebrate the show's 100th episode.
101	9	"65 Hours"	Mark Strand	Meredith Philpott & Dan Hamamura	August 1, 2016	2M7259	4.09
The arraignment of Steve Banyan (Travis Johns) is being held, with Phillip Dayton (Episode 7.2) representing him. Banyan is accused of killing a Mr. and Mrs. Hammond (Cameron Bender and Bridgid Coulter) in a home invasion robbery two years prior. The only piece of forensic evidence pertaining to this double homicide is missing from the BPD, and Judge Huang (Sumalee Montano) gives the team a deadline to find either it or further information about the murders in the 65 hours before Banyan is released on a technicality.
102	10	"For Richer or Poorer"	Sasha Alexander	Ken Hanes	August 15, 2016	2M7260	3.87
The shooting death of a forensic accountant uncovers a Ponzi scheme -- and the surprising news that Maura was once married to the prime suspect. Angela's ex-boyfriend Ron returns, declaring that he is still in love with her.
103	11	"Stiffed"	Jan Nash	Katie Wech	August 22, 2016	2M7261	4.75
The team investigates a body found together in the casket with someone else set to be buried. Angela accepts that Jane will be working for the FBI, Tommy and TJ move back to Boston, and Maura does rounds at the clinic.
104	12	"Yesterday, Today, Tomorrow"	Greg Prange	Ron McGee	August 29, 2016	2M7262	4.83
Korsak investigates the murders of a father and daughter, forty years apart. He was dating the daughter's sister back at the time of the first murder, and his proximity to the case inspired his career choice. The father's death deeply affects him and he announces his retirement. Jane, albeit appreciative of their efforts, puts an end to Angela and Maura assisting with her move. Maura ponders moving to France for a month to work on her book.
105	13	"Ocean-Frank"	Michael Robin	Russell J. Grant & Jan Nash	September 5, 2016	2M7263	5.26
The team's final investigation involves a dead man found handcuffed to a bedpost. Also, Kent prepares video testimonials from everyone, Korsak uses his vacation time and sick days to retire nearly a month early, and Jane announces that she is taking time off to vacation in Paris with Maura.

== Home video releases ==
Season	Episodes	DVD release dates			
Season	Episodes	Region 1	Region 2	Region 4	Discs
1	10	June 28, 2011	October 29, 2012	August 29, 2012	3
2	15	May 22, 2012	March 18, 2013	August 29, 2012	3
3	15	June 11, 2013	November 25, 2013	June 19, 2013	3
4	16	June 10, 2014	November 3, 2014	June 25, 2014	4
5	18	June 2, 2015	August 24, 2015	January 20, 2016	4
6	18	June 7, 2016	August 15, 2016	January 18, 2017	4
7	13	January 17, 2017	TBA	September 13, 2017	3
The Complete Series	105	January 17, 2017	October 16, 2017	September 13, 2017	24

== Episodic viewership ==
Rizzoli & Isles : U.S. viewers per episode (millions)

Season	Episode number																	
Season	1	2	3	4	5	6	7	8	9	10	11	12	13	14	15	16	17	18
1	7.55	7.27	6.55	6.61	7.42	6.49	6.73	6.42	7.24	6.56	–							
2	6.38	6.40	6.04	6.45	6.46	6.74	6.27	6.71	6.69	5.63	4.78	3.86	4.91	5.32	5.79	–		
3	5.62	5.13	5.36	5.43	5.32	5.52	5.84	5.59	4.44	6.04	3.44	4.75	3.79	3.42	4.42	–		
4	6.64	5.90	5.58	5.22	5.49	5.33	5.50	5.60	5.61	6.00	5.88	5.70	3.73	3.35	4.75	3.58	–	
5	5.81	5.50	5.43	5.13	4.86	5.23	4.77	5.09	5.68	5.21	5.16	5.04	3.58	2.86	3.51	3.12	3.39	3.62
6	4.39	4.01	4.39	4.42	4.12	4.16	4.40	4.23	4.33	4.52	4.59	4.77	2.34	2.59	2.40	2.43	3.33	2.92
7	3.91	3.58	4.00	4.13	4.36	4.14	4.05	3.87	4.09	3.87	4.75	4.83	5.26	–				

Audience measurement performed by Nielsen Media Research
