= The Sinner (novel) =

2003 novel by Tess Gerritsen

- Author: Tess Gerritsen
- Language: English
- Series: Maura Isles; Jane Rizzoli
- Genre: Crime novel
- Publication date: 2003
- Publication place: United States
- Media type: Print (Hardback & Paperback)
- Preceded by: The Apprentice
- Followed by: Body Double

The Sinner is a 2003 mystery novel by Tess Gerritsen, the third book of the Maura Isles/Jane Rizzoli series.

== Plot ==
The Sinner involves Detective Jane Rizzoli and a main character new to the series, first seen in "The Apprentice" as a minor figure, medical examiner Dr. Maura Isles. When a young novice nun about to take vows is found murdered in the abbey's summer chapel, Isles and Rizzoli are immediately called to the scene. The elderly nuns are of little help to Isles and Rizzoli but when another body is found, mutilated beyond recognition (and testing reveals the body to be that of a fortyish Indian Hansen's Disease victim), it is soon discovered that there is more to these killings than meets the eye. Dr. Victor Banks hooks up with Maura Isles.
