= Body double (disambiguation) =

In filmmaking, a body double or simply double is a person who substitutes in a scene for another actor, with the person's face not being shown.

Body double may also refer to:

- Body Double, a 1984 American erotic thriller film
- Body Double (novel), 2004, the fourth book of the Maura Isles/Jane Rizzoli series by Tess Gerritsen
- Body doubling or parallel working, a strategy used to initiate and complete tasks that involves the physical or virtual presence of someone with whom one shares their goals
- "Body Double" (Murdoch Mysteries), a 2008 television episode
