= The Surgeon (novel) =

Novel by Tess Gerritsen

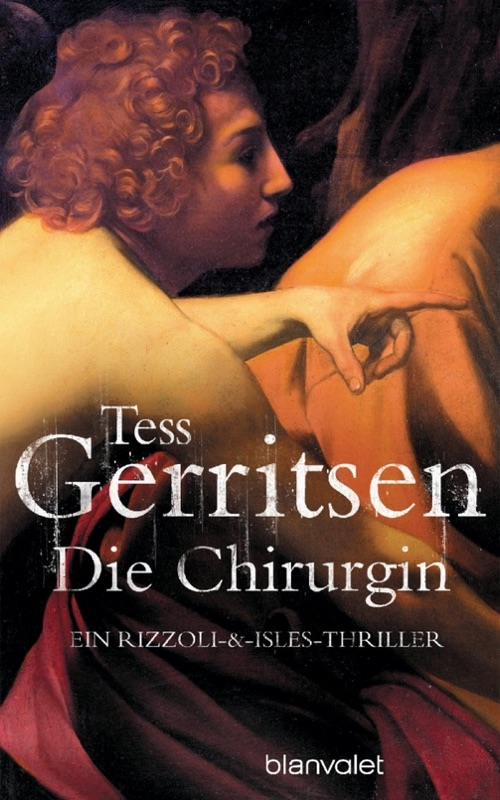
- Author: Tess Gerritsen
- Language: English
- Series: Maura Isles/Jane Rizzoli
- Genre: Crime
- Publication date: 2001
- Publication place: United States
- Media type: Print (hardback & paperback)
- ISBN: 9780739420416
- OCLC: 47045164
- Followed by: The Apprentice

The Surgeon (2001) is a suspense novel by Tess Gerritsen, the first of the Maura Isles/Jane Rizzoli series.

== Plot ==
A terrifying new serial killer begins stalking the streets of Boston, using his vast medical knowledge to systematically torture and kill vulnerable women, a modus operandi which has earned him the nickname "the Surgeon". As Jane Rizzoli, accompanied by detective Thomas Moore, works the case, she comes across trauma doctor Catherine Cordell, who almost died in the same fashion at the hands of another psychopath several years before, but killed him before he could kill her. Rizzoli soon establishes a connection between the two cases, concluding that she may be on the trail of a deranged copycat.

The story opens up with the death of Elena Ortiz at the hands of the Surgeon, and Thomas Moore is sent to investigate. The murder is tied to another murder by the Surgeon, Diana Sterling, a year previous. Rizzoli and Moore note that both had no contact or connection whatsoever, and are perplexed by these two murders. Meanwhile, the Surgeon begins targeting his third victim, Nina Peyton, and Cordell continues to save lives, starting with Herman Gwadowski. The Surgeon is also starting to get closer and closer to Cordell, who is creating a romantic and sexual connection with Thomas Moore. In the end, Jane manages to save Cordell from the Surgeon, and Moore marries Cordell.

== Literary significance and reception ==
The Surgeon received a RITA award Romance Writers of America in 2002 for Best Romantic Suspense Novel.
