= Black Talon =

Brand of hollow-point ammunition

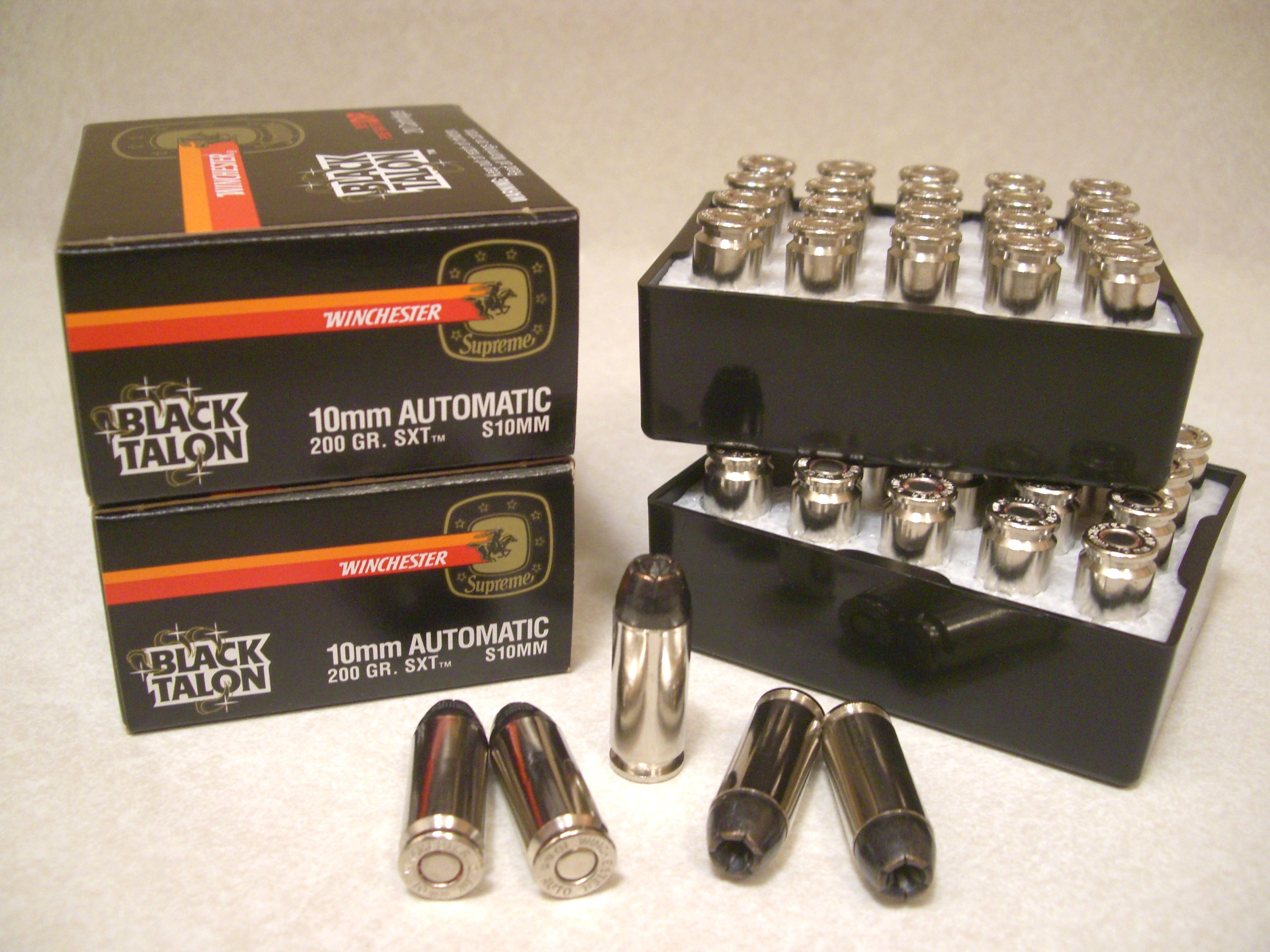
- 10mm Black Talon ammunition

Black Talon was a brand of hollow-point pistol and rifle ammunition produced by Winchester between 1991 and 2000. Intended for law enforcement and self-defense applications, Black Talon rounds featured a unique construction that created a sharp petal-like shape after expansion following impact with tissue or other wet media. Black Talon ammunition was produced in 9×19mm Parabellum, 10mm Auto, .40 S&W, .45 ACP, .357 Magnum, .44 Magnum, .300 Winchester Magnum, .308 Winchester, .338 Winchester Magnum, and .30-06 Springfield.

Black Talon drew controversy in the early 1990s following a media circus surrounding its purported effects, as well as its use in several mass shootings. Winchester discontinued sales to the general public in 1993 and ceased manufacture of all Black Talon-branded munitions in 2000, though Winchester has since continued to produce and sell nearly identical rounds under different brand names.

== Design ==
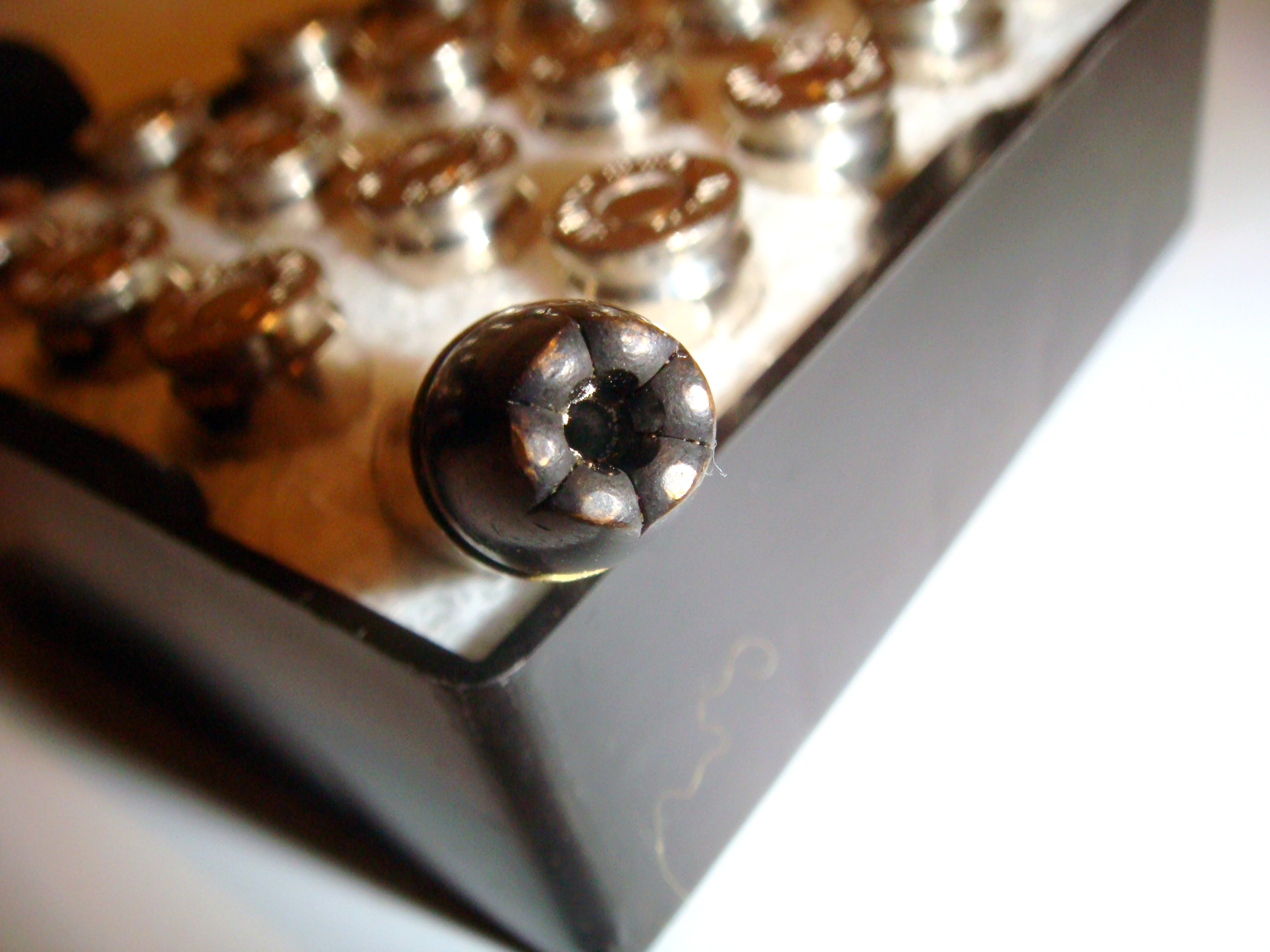
Detail of a 9×19mm Black Talon bullet

The Black Talon bullet was designed in 1991 under the supervision of Alan Corzine, then Winchester's VP of research and development.

The Black Talon handgun bullet (from the resemblance of the opened segments to the talons of a bird of prey) is a jacketed hollow-point bullet with perforations designed to expose sharp edges upon expansion. The bullet featured a Lubalox coating, a proprietary oxide process, that gave it an unusual black appearance compared to other copper-jacketed or lead bullets. Though widely misreported to be Teflon, molybdenum disulfide, or wax, the Lubalox coating was simply intended to protect the barrel rifling, and did not give the bullet armor-piercing capabilities. This coating is still widely used on many of Winchester's rifle bullets.

The Black Talon rifle bullet did not share the handgun bullet's barbed petal design and was essentially a solid copper hollow-point with a hollowed out rear shank containing a lead core in a steel liner to prevent jacket rupture thus maintaining necessary penetration in tough game. This ammunition line was renamed Fail Safe.

== Reception and controversy ==
Upon its release, Black Talon bullets were lauded by law enforcement and firearms enthusiasts and quickly developed a reputation as a very effective expanding bullet, despite mostly being comparable in performance to conventional hollow-point rounds. Colonel Leonard J. Supenski of the Baltimore County Police Department praised its effectiveness in police use, stating that "It has the stopping power that police officers need and it is less likely to ricochet or go through the bad guy."

However, critics alleged Black Talon bullets caused unnecessary physical damage, even compared to regular hollow-point bullets, and questioned why they were allowed to be sold. Public and media scrutiny of Black Talon bullets sharply increased after they were used during the 101 California Street shooting in San Francisco in July 1993 that killed ten people (including the perpetrator) and injured six, one of whom was so seriously wounded that they eventually died of their injuries in 1995. It was argued that the Black Talon bullets inflicted far more grievous and painful wounds to the victims and that they played a direct role in several of the fatalities. However, Physician Boyd Stevens, the San Francisco Medical Examiner who performed the victims' autopsies, later recalled at the 1994 International Wound Ballistics Association Conference in Sacramento that the wound trauma caused by the Black Talon bullets was unremarkable and that all of the victims died due to penetration of a vital structure.

Further scrutiny arose in December 1993 when Black Talon bullets were used in the Long Island Rail Road shooting in Garden City Park, New York that killed six and injured 19 (including two more from non-firearm injuries). In 1996, a lawsuit was filed by a victim's family against Olin Corporation (McCarthy v. Sturm, Ruger and Co., Inc., 916 F.Supp. 366 (S.D.N.Y., 1996)), arguing Olin should be liable for the shooting based on the design, manufacture, marketing, and sale of Black Talon ammunition. The claims against Olin were dismissed because it was held that the plaintiff could not prevail because there were no defects in manufacturing, design, or in warnings—the bullets "functioned exactly as designed".

In March 2014, The Guardian reported that South African paralympic athlete Oscar Pistorius had shot to death his girlfriend Reeva Steenkamp on Valentine's Day the previous year with four Black Talons fired from a 9mm pistol. Describing the round, South African Police Service ballistics expert Captain Christian Mangena explained, "It hits the target, it opens up, it creates six talons, and these talons are sharp. It cuts through the organs of a human being."

However, some critiques were partly based on misinformation, owing to the media circus that formed around Black Talon bullets and some confusions by journalists and writers unfamiliar with munitions and firearm terminology. For instance, it was sometimes alleged that Black Talon bullets were armor-piercing rounds or were able to pierce armor, possibly confusing "Talon" with "Teflon". Some medical personnel were also concerned that the sharp barb-like tips of the expanded rounds could potentially tear gloves and cut medical personnel's hands during treatment, exposing them to greater risk of infection, though no cases of this happening are known to have ever been documented.

In response to the controversies, in 1993, Winchester withdrew all Black Talon ammunition from the civilian market. They continued to be produced and sold to law enforcement until 2000, when the Black Talon line was discontinued. Despite the controversies, at no time was Black Talon ammunition ever prohibited by law in the United States.

== Successors ==
Despite the Black Talon brand having been discontinued in 2000, nearly identical munitions have been produced by Winchester almost immediately after its discontinuation.

=== Ranger SXT/T-Series ===
The Ranger SXT ("Supreme eXpansion Technology") was released by Winchester shortly after the discontinuation of Black Talon, in the early- or mid-2000s. It is nearly identical to Black Talon bullets, but without the black Lubalox coating on the bullet. The hollow point cavity dimensions and angles of the meplat were altered to enhance reliability of expansion, though the basic "reverse taper" design pioneered by the Black Talon was retained. This "reverse taper" refers to the bullet's jacket being thicker at the tip than toward the base, enhancing rigidity which allows the sharp petals to remain largely perpendicular to the wound path, unlike traditional designs where the expanding jacket petals would peel back almost completely behind the expanded lead mushroom. This difference is obvious after firing into ballistic gelatin.

In 2007, Winchester updated the Ranger SXT line and renamed it to the Ranger T-Series. Besides further dimensional changes to the hollow point for reliable expansion, the distinctive perpendicular petals were made longer yet more rounded at the tips to retain stiffness.

=== Bonded PDX1 ===
In 2009, Winchester-Olin released a new hollow point bullet in its Supreme Elite line of handgun ammunition called the Bonded PDX1. It is similar to the Ranger SXT series and the older Black Talon design in its structure, and is available in several calibers and loadings. The most obvious difference from the SXT is that the bonded design, meant to maintain structural integrity through difficult intermediate barriers like auto-glass, largely prevents the sharp petals from peeling away from the lead core and fully protruding into the wound track. The .40 S&W PDX1 cartridge is available for purchase by civilian shooters and was the primary service ammunition of the FBI until 2017 when they switched to the Hornady Critical Duty line.

=== M1152 Special Purpose ===
Following the United States Army's selection of the SIG Sauer P320-derived M17 pistol in the Modular Handgun System competition, the Army announced two new 9mm rounds would be adopted alongside the gun: the M1152 Ball, a 115 grain full metal jacket round "for use against enemy personnel, for training, and for force protection"; and the M1153 Special Purpose, a 147 grain jacketed hollow-point round "for use in situations where limited over-penetration of targets is necessary to reduce collateral damage." The latter hollow-point round is conspicuously similar to the Black Talon and Ranger T-Series, though Winchester only stated it was designed to "maximize performance based on the government specification set out in the request for proposal." Both the round and the firearm have subsequently been adopted by all branches of the United States Armed Forces, except for the Coast Guard.

== In popular culture ==
A fictionalized version of the Black Talon bullet called the "Black Death" is used by Hank Schrader in a pivotal scene in the Breaking Bad episode "One Minute".

In E.R., Season 8, Episode 10, “I’ll Be Home for Christmas,” a Black Talon bullet injures a six year old boy. Doctor Romano identifies the bullet by its razor sharp fragments.

Black Talon bullets are used by The Professor in the 1997 anime film City Hunter: Goodbye My Sweetheart.

Black Talon bullets are referenced in season 1, episode 15 of Law & Order: Special Victims Unit.

Black Talon bullets are referenced in The Mountain Goats album Bleed Out, in the track "First Blood", where they are erroneously called armor-piercing.

Black Talon bullets are mentioned in The Notorious B.I.G. album Ready to Die, in the track "Warning".

Black Talon bullets are mentioned in 50 Cent's track "When It Rains It Pours" from the soundtrack of his autobiographical film.

Black Talon bullets are mentioned in the song "sameolemeek" by Meek Mill.

In Tess Gerritsen's novel Body Double, a murder victim is killed with a Black Talon bullet.

In the Preston & Child novel White Fire, Stacy Bowdree, an ex-USAF Captain, says she has a couple of Black Talons for the would-be assassin of another character (Corrie Swanson).

== See also ==
- Full metal jacket bullet
- Jacketed hollow point
- Soft point bullet
- Terminal ballistics
- Winchester Repeating Arms Company
