= The Apprentice (Gerritsen novel) =

Gerritsen novel

- Author: Tess Gerritsen
- Language: English
- Series: Maura Isles; Jane Rizzoli
- Genre: Crime
- Publication date: 2002
- Publication place: United States
- Media type: Print (hardback & paperback)
- Preceded by: The Surgeon
- Followed by: The Sinner

The Apprentice is a 2002 novel written by Tess Gerritsen, second book of the Maura Isles/Jane Rizzoli series. Both the hardcover and paperback editions reached number 10 in The New York Times Best Seller lists.

== Plot ==
Rizzoli investigates a murder in which cutting techniques were used similar to those used by imprisoned Warren Hoyt. Isles determines that the murder involved necrophilia. FBI Agent Gabriel Dean calls Rizzoli to Washington, D.C., where he shows her a list of similar crimes committed in Bosnia. Dean calls the suspect "The Dominator".

Hoyt escapes from prison after reading about "The Dominator's" murders which copy many of his techniques, and plots with him to trap Rizzoli. Eventually, "The Dominator" kidnaps Rizzoli as she returns to Boston, and takes her into the countryside. In her struggle to stay alive, Rizzoli fights back, kills "The Dominator" and severely wounds Hoyt, making him a quadriplegic.

Rizzoli then takes a long-overdue vacation, claiming sick-leave, with Dean.
