= Teflon-coated bullet =

Type of small arms ammunition

Teflon-coated bullets, sometimes colloquially known as "cop killer bullets", are bullets that have been coated in polytetrafluoroethylene.

== History ==
In the 1960s, Paul Kopsch (an Ohio coroner), Daniel Turcus (a police sergeant), and Donald Ward (Kopsch's special investigator) began experimenting with special purpose handgun ammunition. Their objective was to develop a law enforcement round capable of improved penetration against hard targets, such as windshield glass and automobile doors. Conventional bullets, made primarily from lead, often become deformed and less effective after striking hard targets, especially when fired at handgun velocities. The inventors named their company "KTW," after their initials.

After some experimentation with sintered tungsten-alloy Kennertium W-10 projectiles, which were eventually abandoned due to supply and cost concerns, the inventors settled on a bullet consisting mostly of hard brass and some with a steel projectile. In testing, the comparatively hard brass bullets wore out barrels far more quickly than standard solid lead and copper-jacketed lead rounds, since they did not deform to fit the rifling. In an attempt to reduce barrel wear, the steel projectiles had a copper cup which made contact with the rifling; on brass projectiles, brass driving bands are present to engage the rifling. Early KTWs were coated with Teflon. The inventors, having also noted that the tips of walking canes were frequently covered with the relatively soft and malleable Teflon to help them grip surfaces, found that the addition of Teflon helped to prevent bullet deflections from vehicle doors and windshields, further improving penetration against those surfaces.

In the late 1960s, KTW begun commercial production. In 1980, continued production of the ammunition was turned over to the North American Ordnance Corporation. The production of KTW-branded ammunition eventually ceased in the 1990s. However, some manufacturers continue to coat their bullets with various compounds, notably Teflon and molybdenum disulfide, as a protective layer against barrel wear.

Not a lot of performance data is available for these bullets, although the 9mm offering was reputed to push a 100-grain (6.5 g) projectile at a velocity of 1,350 feet per second (410 m/s).

== Lethality debate ==
In 1982, NBC broadcast a television special on Teflon-coated bullets that argued they were a serious threat to American law enforcement because of their supposedly increased ability to penetrate ballistic vests. This led various US gun control organizations to label these types of bullets with the epithet "cop killers". In 1983, US Representative Mario Biaggi reported that Du Pont Company officials agreed to stop selling teflon to individuals and companies that used it to make ammunition.

Several calibers of KTW rounds were proven to penetrate ballistic vests under certain conditions. However, their inventor Kopsch said in a 1990 interview that "adding a Teflon coating to the round added 20% penetration power on metal and glass. Critics kept complaining about Teflon's ability to penetrate body armor [...] In fact, Teflon cut down on the round's ability to cut through the nylon or Kevlar of body armor."

== Legal status ==
=== United States ===
The federal ban on armor-piercing pistol ammunition uses only the composition of the bullet's core to determine legality. However, many individual states have legislation restricting various kinds of coating materials, for example:

- Alabama state law provides that "the possession or sale of brass or steel teflon-coated handgun ammunition is illegal anywhere within the State of Alabama".
- Hawaii state law prohibits the "manufacture, possession, sale, barter, trade, gift, transfer, or acquisition of ... any type of ammunition or any projectile component thereof coated with teflon or any other similar coating designed primarily to enhance its capability to penetrate metal or pierce protective armor."
- Kansas state laws states possessing, manufacturing, causing to be manufactured, selling, offering for sale, lending, purchasing or giving away any cartridge which can be fired by a handgun and which has a plastic-coated bullet that has a core of less than 60% lead by weight, whether the person knows or has reason to know that the plastic-coated bullet has a core of less than 60% lead by weight is unlawful.
- North Carolina state law specifically forbids persons in that state to "import, manufacture, possess, store, transport, sell, offer to sell, purchase, offer to purchase, deliver or give to another, or acquire any Teflon-coated bullet".
- Oklahoma – Teflon-coated bullets are illegal in Oklahoma under some circumstances.
- Oregon state law forbids the possession of any handgun ammunition, the bullet or projectile of which is coated with Teflon while committing or intending to commit a felony.
- Pennsylvania state law provides that "It is unlawful for any person to possess, use or attempt to use a KTW teflon-coated bullet or other armor-piercing ammunition while committing or attempting to commit" certain enumerated "crime[s] of violence".
- South Carolina state law specifically bans "ammunition or shells that are coated with polytetrafluoroethylene (Teflon)".
- Virginia state law specifically bans "bullets, projectiles or other types of ammunition that are: coated with or contain, in whole or in part, polytetrafluoroethylene (Teflon) or a similar product" while committing or attempting to commit a crime.

== See also ==
- Armor-piercing shot and shell
- Black Talon, a type of expanding, hollow-point ammunition also described in the early 1990s as "cop-killer bullets".
