= Janet Tamaro =

American television writer

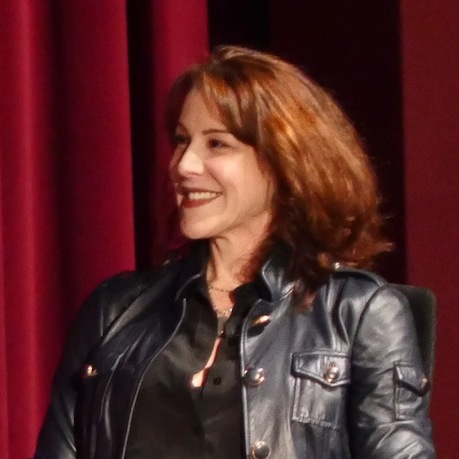
- Janet Tamaro at Showrunners Documentary Premiere Panel (2014)
- Born: Janet Tamaro
- Occupations: Television writer and show runner, including Rizzoli & Isles
- Years active: 2000–present
- Children: 2

Janet Tamaro is an American television writer, series creator, executive producer, and showrunner.

Sasha Alexander, Bruce McGill, Janet Tamaro and Angie Harmon in September 2011

== Biography ==
Tamaro began her career as an on-camera television correspondent. She worked for ABC NEWSOne, Inside Edition, and the Travel Channel as a correspondent and host. Tamaro is the author of the book So That's What They're For!: Breastfeeding Basics, originally published in 1998.

Tamaro has written for many television series, including Law & Order: Special Victims Unit, Line of Fire, CSI: NY, Lost, Bones, Sleeper Cell, and Trauma. Tamaro worked as a freelance writer for the first season of Lost in 2004. Tamaro and the Lost writing staff won the Writers Guild of America award for Best Dramatic Series at the February 2006 ceremony for their work on the first and second seasons. Tamaro was also nominated for an Emmy Award for her work on Sleeper Cell.

In 2010, Tamaro created the TNT television series Rizzoli & Isles, which was inspired by the crime novels written by Tess Gerritsen. The series has been a hit for TNT for seven seasons and has sold into worldwide syndication.

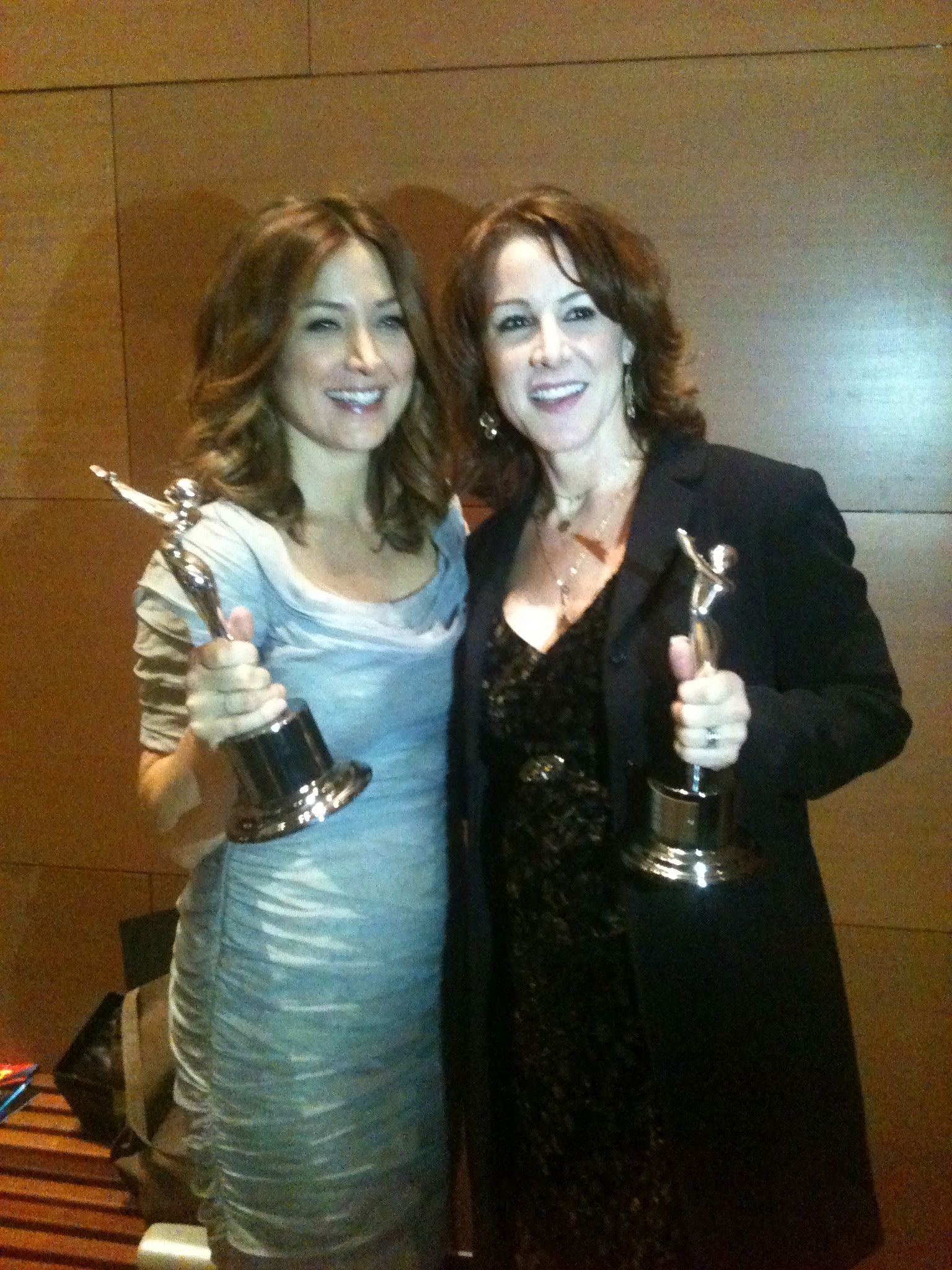
Sasha Alexander and Janet Tamaro at the Gracie Awards

Tamaro has earned a Gracie Allen Award the Alliance for Women in Media Foundation, a Women's Image Network (WIN) Award, and Prevention magazine's Healthy TV Award for her work on the show. She was named as one of the top 50 showrunners in the Hollywood Reporter 2010, 2011, and 2012. She is featured in the documentary SHOWRUNNERS: The Art of Running a TV Show. She sits on the advisory board of WeForShe, a media advocacy group that strives to find practical ways to bring about a gender-balanced landscape in television.

Janet Tamaro did her undergraduate study at UC Berkeley and later earned a master's degree in journalism at Columbia University. She has two daughters.
