= Body Double (novel) =

Book by Tess Gerritsen

- Author: Tess Gerritsen
- Language: English
- Series: Maura Isles; Jane Rizzoli
- Genre: Crime novel
- Publication date: 2004
- Publication place: United States
- Media type: Print (hardback & paperback)
- Preceded by: The Sinner (Gerritsen novel)
- Followed by: Vanish

Body Double is a 2004 novel written by Tess Gerritsen, the fourth book of the Maura Isles/Jane Rizzoli series.

== Plot ==
Returning to Boston from a business trip in Paris, Maura Isles encounters delays at Charles de Gaulle Airport, and finds upon landing in Boston that the airline has lost her luggage. When she finally makes it home, she finds her house taped off as a crime scene—and is surprised to see Jane Rizzoli (now about 8 months pregnant) and Rizzoli's partner Barry Frost there. Rizzoli does a double-take on seeing Maura, and directs her attention to a white Ford Taurus in her driveway. There, Maura finds the body of a woman who looks identical to her—and also shares the same birthday.

When the body is taken in to the medical examiner's office, Maura takes a tissue sample from the dead woman, and one from herself and asks Rizzoli to take them for DNA testing. The woman is found to have been killed by a 'Black Talon' bullet.

Meanwhile, Matilda Purvis, the almost-9-months-pregnant wife of a BMW dealership manager, visits the dealership after an OB-GYN appointment—and is belittled by her husband (whom she had married when she was two months pregnant) for ruining the tires. When she goes home, she finds she is not alone—and is struck unconscious when thinking the other to be her husband, she calls his name.

Newton police detective Rick Ballard tells Maura that he believes that a CEO of a pharmaceutical company is the murderer, due to the latter's obsessive lust over the deceased woman, Anna Leoni (on her driver's license, the name was recorded as Jessop). Maura's curiosity is aroused further when Rizzoli hands her DNA results showing that the deceased is her identical-twin sister. The trail then leads to Maine, where the remains of several murder victims (mostly pregnant women, but including some men) are found. A check of the FBI database over forty years reveals a possible pattern circumnavigating the US. Maura eventually finds that her mother, Amalathea Lank, has been jailed for two murders, one of a 9-months-pregnant woman. Eventually, she also works out that Amalathea and her cousin Elijah (whom she eventually married) had been killing women who were just about to deliver and then taking out the babies and selling them. She also finds that Ballard was in love with Anna, and that he also likes her very much (Maura is also attracted to him).

Matilda wakes up in a coffin-like box, and tries to plead with the kidnapper to release her—only to realise that he is not interested in the money. She plans her escape, saving torch batteries for use as a weapon. Eventually, when the kidnapper gets close, Mattie stuns him with the batteries (which she has wrapped into a sock) and flees into a toolshed; when the kidnapper pursues, she hits him again with the battery-filled sock and stabs him with a screwdriver. The stress of the pursuit, however, brings on labour and the police later find her nursing her daughter and take both to hospital. The killer is revealed to be Maura's younger brother Samuel (their father, Elijah, had died prior to the murders for which Amalathea was caught—due to a gas station's security video).

However, the investigation of Anna Leoni's murder appears to have hit a dead-end, as no firearm was found on Samuel. Rizzoli then finds an old police report on a previous slaying involving 'Black Talons' and, seeing the endnotes, summons Frost to help protect Maura. Meeting Rick in her car, Maura is about to kiss him when he is murdered by his ex-wife Carmen. Carmen confesses to having killed Anna and shoots Maura, wounding her only to be fatally shot immediately afterward by Rizzoli and the parking lot's security guard.

== Literary significance and reception ==
Booklist called Body Double a "taut thriller", Publishers Weekly said that the "startling twists, the revelation of ghoulishly practical motives and a nail biting finale make this Gerritsen's best to date". Entertainment Weekly was not as impressed, saying that "the face-offs between Isles and her killer mom — which should have smacked of The Silence of the Lambs — fall flat. Body works the brain a bit, but unfortunately leaves the nerves intact." The Bookseller agreed, saying that "Body Double is one to stay away from."
