= Gun laws in Oklahoma =

Location of Oklahoma in the United States

Gun laws in Oklahoma regulate the manufacture, sale, possession, and use of firearms and ammunition in the state of Oklahoma in the United States.

Oklahoma is generally a gun-friendly state, and has mostly less-restrictive gun laws. Being part of the Southern United States and Western United States, Oklahoma is home to a strong gun culture, which is reflected in Oklahoma's gun laws.

On May 15, 2012, Oklahoma State Senate Bill 1733 was signed into law by Governor Mary Fallin, which authorized open and concealed carry of handguns by permit holders. This law took effect November 1, 2012, and made Oklahoma the 25th state of the United States to allow licensed open carry. On February 27, 2019, Governor Kevin Stitt signed constitutional carry into law. The law became effective on November 1, 2019.

== Summary table ==
Subject / law	Long guns	Handguns	Relevant statutes	Notes
State permit required to purchase?	No	No		
Firearm registration?	No	No		
Assault weapon law?	No	No		
Magazine capacity restriction?	No	No		
Owner license required?	No	No		
Red Flag law?	No	No	§ 21-1289.24c	Oklahoma has an anti-red flag law that bars the state or any political subdivision thereof from enacting laws allowing or mandating the confiscation of firearms from individuals who are not legally prohibited under state and federal law from owning firearms.
Permit required for concealed carry?	N/A	No	§ 21-1272 § 21-1290.5	Oklahoma is a "shall issue" state for citizens and lawful permanent residents who are 21 years or older. Permitless carry took effect on November 1, 2019.
Permit required for open carry?	No	No		May carry openly without permit.
Castle Doctrine/Stand Your Ground law?	Yes	Yes	§ 21-1289.25	"A person who is not engaged in an unlawful activity and who is attacked in any other place where he or she has a right to be has no duty to retreat and has the right to stand his or her ground and meet force with force, including deadly force, if he or she reasonably believes it is necessary to do so to prevent death or great bodily harm to himself or herself or another or to prevent the commission of a forcible felony."
State preemption of local restrictions?	Yes	Yes	§ 21-1289.24	"No municipality or other political subdivision of this state shall adopt any order, ordinance or regulation concerning in any way the sale, purchase, purchase delay, transfer, ownership, use, keeping, possession, carrying, bearing, transportation, licensing, permit, registration, taxation other than sales and compensating use taxes or other controls on firearms, knives, components, ammunition and supplies."
NFA weapons restricted?	No	No		
Shall certify?	Yes	Yes	§ 21-1289.30	Shall certify within 15 days.
Peaceable Journey laws?	No	No		
Background checks required for private sales?	No	No		

== Buying, selling, and owning firearms ==
=== Private sales ===
In Oklahoma (under state law), private sales of firearms are legal. However, knowingly selling a firearm to a person who cannot legally purchase or possess the firearm (such as a convicted felon or drug addict) is illegal, and punishable by up to 180 days in jail. Under state law, one must be 21 to buy a firearm of any type from a private seller.

=== Prohibited persons ===
Felons and certain juvenile offenders are prohibited from buying or owning firearms. One must be 21 years of age to carry a handgun, with a few exceptions for special circumstances. When purchasing a firearm from a dealer, one must complete a federal background check. This process (passing the background check) usually only takes a few minutes, but the government has up to three days to complete the background check. After three days, the dealer has the right to proceed or deny the transfer. There is no limit to the number of firearms that a person may buy or own under state law.

=== Minors and firearms ===
Minors may own firearms that are given to them by their parents, relatives, or legal guardians. However, they may not generally possess firearms unsupervised until they are 18 years of age. There are exceptions to this rule, such as when a minor possessing a hunting license (and having passed a hunter's safety course) is hunting, possession of firearm(s) on certain types of private property, and possession of firearm(s) in one's own home.

=== Title II firearms (NFA) ===
Owning or possessing a short-barreled shotgun or short-barreled rifle is illegal and a felony under state law, unless the short-barreled firearm is registered under the National Firearms Act. Owning or possessing a fully automatic firearm is not illegal under state law, but is still illegal under federal law unless the automatic firearm is registered under the National Firearms Act. Local and State authorities are not obligated to enforce federal firearms law or notify federal authorities of federal firearms law violations, however they may, or may not, choose to do so.

== Carrying firearms in public ==
As of November 1, 2019, Oklahoma no longer requires a permit for a person to legally carry a concealed or open firearm in public if they are 21+ years old. Permits are still available and are issued by the Oklahoma State Bureau of Investigation. Individuals must pass a background check, meet certain requirements, be at least 21 years of age, and pass a firearms handling and safety course to be issued a permit. Individuals can carry at 18+ if have a permit from out-of-state. Carrying on public buses was legalized on November 1, 2017.

=== Restrictions on carrying handguns ===
Carrying handguns with a caliber greater than .45 is not allowed. Neither is it permitted to carry in an establishment whose primary purpose is the serving of alcoholic beverages or to consume alcoholic beverages while carrying. Carry is allowed in an establishment that serves alcoholic beverages (such as a restaurant that serves alcoholic beverages) as long as that is not the primary purpose of the establishment. It is not permitted to carry into schools or government buildings. Unless carry is allowed by the property owner or event holder, it is illegal to carry into a sports venue during a professional sporting event or in any place where gambling is authorized (such as a casino). As of November 1, 2019, concealed carry, but not open carry, in zoos. However, it is lawful to carry concealed or open in any Federal, State, or municipal public park.

=== Handgun carry reciprocity ===
Oklahoma recognizes all out-of-state handgun carry permits, even if the issuing state does not recognize an Oklahoma carry permit. Prior to November 1, 2019, anyone who resided in a state where carrying a handgun does not require a license and who is legally eligible to carry in their state was able to carry a handgun in Oklahoma without a permit. As of November 1, 2019, the law was expanded to allow for permitless carry for anyone legally eligible to possess a firearm.

=== Carry on private property ===
Open or concealed carry of a firearm on privately owned land or inside a residence (such as a backyard, in one's own home, or a large farm) is legal for persons 18 years and older who can legally possess firearms, and no permit is required. Brandishing a firearm without good, legal cause (such as self-defense, defense of another, or lawful defense of property) is illegal. Carrying a firearm on private property generally requires the consent/permission of the property owner.

=== Prohibited places and authorized persons ===
Carrying of any firearms or weapons in a government building or on school grounds is illegal. The only exceptions to this law are for licensed government or security personnel, such as state police officers, agents of the federal government, and certain security guards. Security guards of at least 21 years of age may receive a license to possess firearms during the course of their official duties if they meet certain requirements. Similarly, licensed private investigators with a CLEET firearms endorsement on their license may also carry into prohibited places. Parking lots are also exempt from prohibited places such as schools, public or private, government buildings, and colleges, however it is unlawful for any person whom is not a law enforcement officer to possess a firearm in any parking lot adjacent to any federal property.

=== Concealed carry on campus ===
Carry on college campuses is illegal. There is an exception to this rule, but it is very specific, and rarely utilized. In order to carry on a college campus, a person must obtain written permission from the president of the specific college where one wishes to carry. The president may issue restrictions or conditions on the permission to carry on campus. Also, a physical copy of the written authorization must be carried while they are carrying concealed on campus. However, the president of the college must now issue a permit on what is known as a "shall issue" basis, meaning that they have no discretion as to whether or not they will issue a permit if a person meets the qualifications imposed by state and federal statutory law to possess and carry a firearm.

Students, teachers and visitors may keep their guns in their locked vehicles in the parking lot of a college, university, or technology center school.

== Specific crimes with firearms ==
Carrying a firearm while substantially intoxicated by alcohol or another drug is a gross misdemeanor, punishable by several weeks to months in jail and possibility of revocation. Being in possession of a firearm or imitation firearm while committing a crime of violence is a felony, regardless of whether or not the firearm or imitation firearm is used in the commission of the said crime of violence. Intentionally discharging a firearm in the commission of a crime of violence is a felony.

Carrying a firearm or dangerous weapon with the intent to commit a crime of violence is a felony.

Intentionally discharging a firearm into, or at, any dwelling, or any building used for public or business purposes, is a felony, regardless of whether or not the dwelling or building is occupied.

Except for self-defense, or the defense of another person, intentionally pointing a firearm, loaded or unloaded, at a person, is a misdemeanor usually punished by several months in jail, and may be prosecuted as a felony, with additional penalties, if the purpose of such pointing was to cause fear, emotional distress, or to intimidate.

It is unlawful for any person to "engage in reckless conduct" while possessing a firearm, if such actions create 'a situation of unreasonable risk and probability of death or great bodily harm to another" and demonstrate "a conscious disregard for the safety of another person".

It is a felony to possess, use, attempt to use, carry, manufacture, cause to be manufactured, import, advertise for sale, or sell ammunition which has "a core of less than sixty percent (60%) lead" or "has a fluorocarbon coating, which is capable of penetrating body armor".

The State of Oklahoma preempts almost all local regulation of firearms. Municipalities may prohibit discharging a firearm within city limits, even on private property. State-licensed or recognized shooting ranges are exempt from city ordinances against discharging firearms. Other than prohibiting firearm discharge, municipalities may not have any laws or ordinances pertaining to firearms, firearm parts, or ammunition that are more restrictive than state law.

== Protection of right to keep and bear arms ==
Section 26 of the bill of rights to the Constitution of the State of Oklahoma states, "The right of a citizen to keep and bear arms in defense of his home, person, or property, or in aid of the civil power, when thereunto legally summoned, shall never be prohibited; but nothing herein contained shall prevent the Legislature from regulating the carrying of weapons."

Some counties have adopted Second Amendment sanctuary resolutions. An anti-red flag law was passed in 2020 and a statewide sanctuary law was passed on April 26, 2021.

== See also ==
- Gun laws in the United States (by state)
