= Stephen Clancy Hill =

American murderer and pornographic actor (1976-2010)

- Born: May 8, 1976; Riverdale Park, Maryland, U.S.
- Died: June 5, 2010 (aged 34); Los Angeles, California, U.S.
- Other name: Steve Driver
- Occupation: Pornographic actor
- Years active: 2007–2010
- Height: 6 ft 2 in (1.88 m)

Stephen Clancy Hill (May 8, 1976 – June 5, 2010) was an American pornographic actor who performed under the screen name Steve Driver. On June 1, 2010, Hill attacked several coworkers with a sword, wounding two and killing fellow actor Herbert Hin Wong (A.K.A. Tom Dong). Four days later, Hill died while being apprehended by police.

== 1998 charges ==
In 1998, Hill was arrested and charged with assault with a handgun while a student at the University of Maryland. The victim in that incident was a teaching assistant who refused to give him an A on a test he had not taken. He was convicted of two lesser charges and sentenced to five years' imprisonment with all but two suspended, and five years' probation. This was subsequently amended to 18 months' house arrest. While on house arrest Hill began watching pornography in great quantities, buying many D.V.D.s on the internet. During the 18 months he became more of a recluse, applied for and received numerous credit cards, and kept purchasing large amounts of online pornography, with no intention of ever paying the creditor's bills. When his sentence was over, he worked for some time in the mortgage-title industry, but police record and bad credit caused him to lose jobs (information accredited directly from Hill's father during Investigation Discovery interview.). Eventually, he moved to the Los Angeles area. In December 2006, his parents set him up in an apartment in the San Fernando Valley. After losing another job, he told his father that he wanted to become an actor. He actually intended to become a porn star.

== Career in pornography ==
Hill never rose to prominence in the pornography industry where he worked mostly as a "mope", a male performer of low status. Actress Alana Evans later said that Hill "struggled in his scenes" and showed little promise as a porn actor. He had a featured role as Barack Obama in the pornographic spoof Palin: Erection 2008. In an unsuccessful effort to establish a signature and stand out from other "mopes", Hill began wearing "monster hands" prop gloves during his porn scenes.

In 2009, Hill was hired by Ultima DVD, a company specializing in fetish films. Ultima DVD gave Hill "pocket money", as well as room and board. He lived for about a year in the Van Nuys studio warehouse where he performed menial tasks besides his work as a porn actor. The company also employed him to update its website but, according to studio owner Eric Jover, ""Everything he did had to be reworked." Female performers reportedly disliked working with Hill because of his poor personal hygiene. Hill's behavior eventually became problematic, and Jover decided that the actor had to move out.

== 2010 murder ==
According to police reports, in June 2010, Stephen Hill had been told he was terminated from Ultima DVD and was being evicted from the premises. The incident escalated, resulting in Hill attacking the studio manager who was trying to persuade him to leave. Three others, including Herbert Wong, rushed to the victim's aid. Two of them were cut with repeated swings of a movie-prop samurai-style machete which Hill had sharpened to a keen edge. All three victims were rushed to Northridge Hospital Medical Center where Wong was pronounced dead.

The two people wounded in the incident were Christopher Rachal, Ultima DVD's studio manager, and Yuri Drell, a neighbor from a nearby business. Hill also attempted to run down Jover with his car before fleeing the scene.

=== Victim ===
Herbert Hin Wong (黄兴) (August 15, 1979 – June 1, 2010) was a fellow pornographic actor. Wong was originally from Monterey Park, California and attended Alhambra High School located in the city of Alhambra, California. Upon high school graduation he attended the University of California, Riverside. He died at Northridge Hospital Medical Center at the age of 30. Wong's movie credits under an alias of "Tom Dong" include Kristina Rose: Dirty Girl (2008), Hookers and Blow 3 (2008), Cum Coat My Throat 5 (2008), and Perverted Planet 4 (2009). Wong had befriended Hill as the latter was starting his career in pornography. The two had met during the shooting of a gangbang scene where they were employed as mopes. Both men appeared together in several films and had been nicknamed by co-workers the "Jackie Chan and Chris Tucker of porn". It was Wong who had recommended Hill to Ultima DVD.

== Death ==
Four days later on June 5, Hill was surrounded by a SWAT team in a residence located around Azul Drive in West Hills. Hill climbed a nearby hill area and was brandishing a sword which he threatened to use to kill himself. Video recording shows that Hill was first shot near the right shoulder by a policeman, most likely with a non-lethal gun. Hill, cornered, went closer to the edge of the cliff. A second shot was fired by another policeman. Then Hill got even closer to the edge, and only then attempted a jump that eventually killed him. The police described the action as a "less than lethal munition".

== Film ==
Hill's story was made into the film Mope, directed by Lucas Heyne and starring Nathan Stewart-Jarrett as Hill and Kelly Sry as Wong. The film premiered in January 2019 at the Sundance Film Festival.
