= Tess Gerritsen =

American novelist (born 1953)

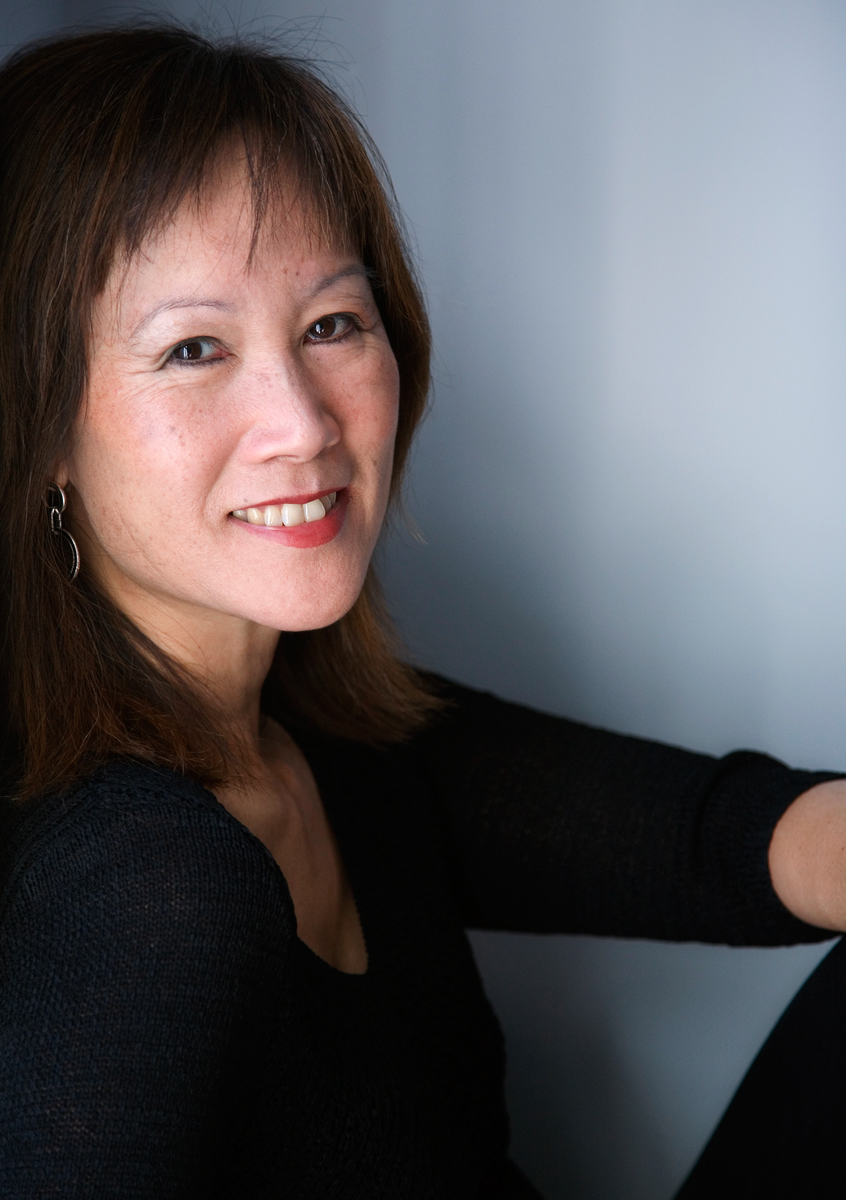
- Born: Terry Tom; June 12, 1953 (age 73); San Diego, California, U.S.
- Education: Stanford University (BA); University of California, San Francisco
- Occupations: Author, surgeon
- Spouse: Jacob Gerritsen
- Children: 2
- Writing career
- Genres: Suspense, Mystery
- Notable work: The Surgeon
- Notable awards: RITA award – Romantic Suspense; 2002 The Surgeon
- Other name: Terry Gerritsen (real name)
- Website: tessgerritsen.com

Terry "Tess" Gerritsen (née Tom; born June 12, 1953) is an American novelist and retired general physician.

== Early life ==
Tess Gerritsen is the child of a Chinese immigrant and a Chinese-American seafood chef. While growing up in San Diego, she often dreamed of writing her own Nancy Drew novels. While she longed to become an author, her family had reservations about the financial sustainability of a writing career, prompting her to go into medicine instead. After graduating from Stanford University in 1975 with a BA in anthropology, she studied medicine at the University of California, San Francisco, receiving her medical degree in 1979. Gerritsen then began work as a physician in Honolulu.

While on maternity leave, she submitted a short story to a statewide fiction contest for Honolulu magazine. Her story, "On Choosing the Right Crack Seed," won the $500 first prize. The narrative focused on a young man reflecting on his difficult relationship with his mother. Gerritsen said the story allowed her to deal with some of her own childhood trauma, including her mother's repeated suicide attempts.

== Writing career ==
Inspired by the romance novels Gerritsen had enjoyed reading as a doctor, her initial books were romantic thrillers. To feminize her first name, originally Terry, she changed it to Tess for her writing in the romantic genre. After two unpublished "practice novels," she sold Call After Midnight to Harlequin Intrigue in 1986, which published it a year later. Gerritsen subsequently wrote eight romantic thrillers for Harlequin Intrigue and Harper Paperbacks.

=== Other genres ===
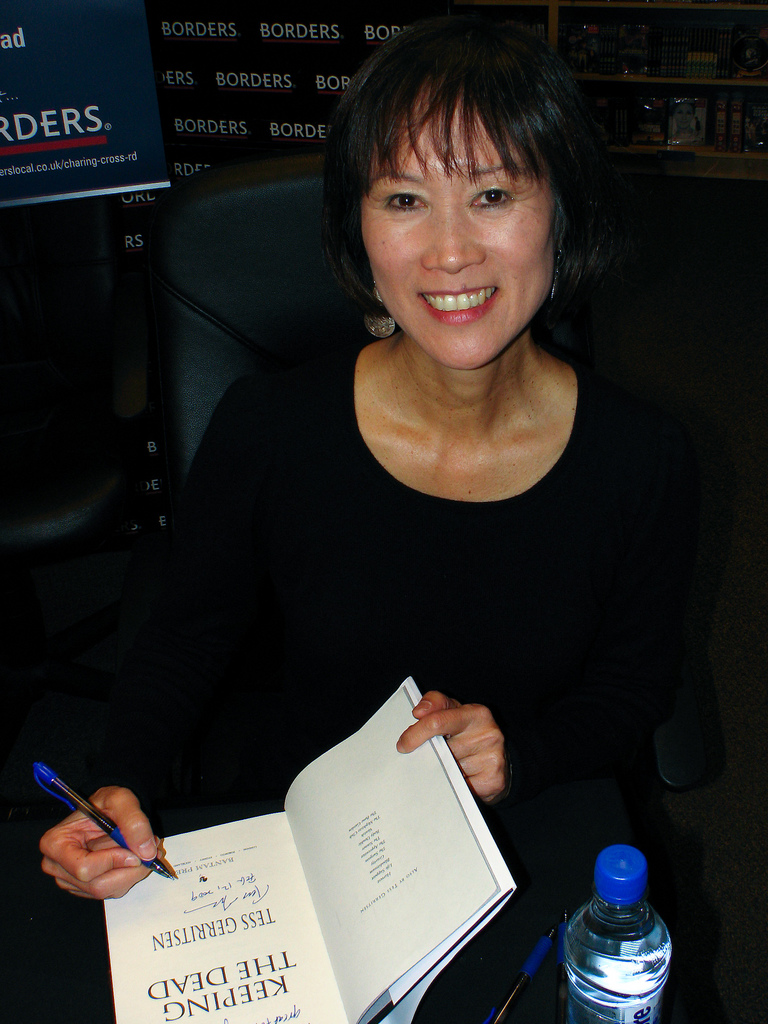
Gerritsen at a book signing.

In 1996, Gerritsen wrote Harvest, her first medical thriller. The plot was inspired by a conversation with a retired homicide detective who had recently traveled in Russia. He told her that young orphans were vanishing from Moscow streets, and police believed they were being kidnapped and shipped abroad as organ donors. Harvest was Gerritsen's first hardcover novel, and it marked her debut on the New York Times bestseller list, where it ranked number 13. Following Harvest, she wrote three more bestselling medical thrillers: Life Support, Bloodstream, and Gravity. In 2014, Gerritsen sued Warner Bros., charging that Alfonso Cuarón's 2013 film Gravity was derived from her book of the same title, to which Warner-owned New Line Cinema had bought the rights, but without crediting or compensating her. The suit was dismissed in 2015.

Gerritsen's first crime thriller, The Surgeon, was published In 2001, introducing homicide detective Jane Rizzoli. Although a secondary character in The Surgeon, Rizzoli—paired with medical examiner Dr. Maura Isles—would become central to 13 subsequent novels (see below). The books inspired the Rizzoli & Isles television series, starring Angie Harmon and Sasha Alexander. Gerritsen also made an appearance in the series' final season as a writer who helps Isles establish herself in the literary field.

Although most of Gerritsen's recent books have been for the Rizzoli/Isles series, she penned a stand-alone historical thriller, in 2007, entitled The Bone Garden. A tale of gruesome murders, the book is set primarily in 1830s Boston and includes a character based on Oliver Wendell Holmes.

Gerritsen's books have been published in 40 countries and have sold 25 million copies.

=== Other works ===
==== Film and television ====
- Adrift (1993)
- Rizzoli & Isles (2010-2016)
- Island Zero (2018)
- Magnificent Beast (2022)

Gerritsen co-wrote the story and screenplay for Adrift, which aired on CBS as Movie of the Week in 1993 and starred Kate Jackson and Bruce Greenwood.

==== Other ====
Gerritsen has contributed essays in volumes published by Mystery Writers of America and International Thriller Writers. She also blogs regularly about the writing business, both on her own website and on a mystery writers site, Murderati.com.

She is also the composer of the musical piece "Incendio" for violin and piano, a waltz that features in the plot of her novel Playing With Fire. The composition has been recorded by violinist Susanne Hou.

=== Chinese legacy ===
Gerritsen's mother told her traditional Chinese stories, e.g. about Monkey King. Her novel The Silent Girl uses Chinese martial arts and motifs borrowed from Chinese culture in contemporary Boston. One of the victims is a Chinese chef.

== Works inspired by Gerritsen ==
Yakov's Lament (2012), a solo violin piece by French composer Damien Top, is inspired by Gerritsen's novel Harvest.

== Personal life ==
Gerritsen is married to Jacob Gerritsen, who is also a physician. They have two sons. She enjoys gardening and playing the fiddle, and lives in Camden, Maine.

== Reception ==
The Surgeon received a RITA award Romance Writers of America in 2002 for Best Romantic Suspense Novel.

In 2006, Vanish received the Nero Award for best mystery novel, and was nominated for both an Edgar Award by the Mystery Writers of America and a Macavity Award. She has also won approval from several of her contemporaries, including James Patterson and Stephen King, the latter of whom described her as being "even better than Michael Crichton".

== Selected bibliography ==
=== Romantic thrillers ===
- Adventure's Mistress (1985)
- Love's Masquerade (1986)
- Call After Midnight (1987)
- Under the Knife (1990)
- Never Say Die (1992)
- Whistle Blower (1992)
- Presumed Guilty (1993)
- Girl Missing (Originally released as Peggy Sue Got Murdered) (1994)
- Keeper of the Bride (1996)
- Perfect Timing (2001)
- Murder and Mayhem (2006)
- Madame X (2008)
- Playing with Fire (2015)
- The Shape of Night (2019)
- Choose Me (with Gary Braver)(2021)

=== Medical thrillers ===
- Harvest (1996)
- Life Support (1997)
- Bloodstream (1998)
- Gravity (1999)
- The Bone Garden (2007)

=== Tavistock series ===
- In Their Footsteps (1994)
- Stolen (Originally released as Thief of Hearts) (1995)

=== Rizzoli & Isles series ===
1. The Surgeon (2001) introduces police detective Jane Rizzoli
2. The Apprentice (2002) introduces medical examiner Dr. Maura Isles
3. The Sinner (2003)
4. Body Double (2004)
5. Vanish (2005)
6. The Mephisto Club (2006)
7. The Keepsake / Keeping the Dead (US / UK, 2008)
8. Ice Cold / The Killing Place (US / UK, 2010)
  8.5 Freaks (short story, 2011)
9. The Silent Girl (US / UK, 2011)
  9.5 John Doe (short story, 2012)
10. Last to Die (UK / US (2012)
11. Die Again (2014)
12. I Know a Secret (2017)
13. Listen to Me (2022)

=== The Martini Club Series ===
Introducing Maggie Bird and Jo Thibodeau in this new series

- The Spy Coast (2023)
- The Summer Guests (2025)
- The Shadow Friends (2026)
