= Rizzoli & Isles =

American crime drama television series (2010–2016)

- Genre: Police procedural; Crime drama
- Based on: Rizzoli & Isles by Tess Gerritsen
- Developed by: Janet Tamaro
- Starring: Angie Harmon; Sasha Alexander; Jordan Bridges; Lee Thompson Young; Bruce McGill; Lorraine Bracco; Brian Goodman; Idara Victor; Adam Sinclair
- Composer: James S. Levine
- Country of origin: United States
- Original language: English
- No. of seasons: 7
- No. of episodes: 105 (list of episodes)

Production
- Executive producers: Bill Haber; Janet Tamaro; Michael M. Robin; Joel Fields; Michael Zinberg; Jan Nash; Ken Hanes; Antoinette Stella; Michael Sardo; Charles Grant Craig; Julie Hebert; Jeff Hayes
- Production location: Los Angeles
- Running time: 45–55 minutes
- Production companies: Hurdler Productions; Ostar Productions; Warner Horizon Television

Original release
- Network: TNT
- Release: July 12, 2010 – September 5, 2016

Rizzoli & Isles (/rɪˈzoʊli ... ˈaɪlz/ riz-OH-lee ... EYELZ; stylized in all lowercase) is an American crime drama television series starring Angie Harmon as Jane Rizzoli and Sasha Alexander as Maura Isles. Based on the series of Rizzoli & Isles novels by Tess Gerritsen, the plot follows Boston homicide police detective Jane Rizzoli and chief medical examiner Dr. Maura Isles combining their experiences and strikingly different personalities to solve cases. It premiered on TNT on July 12, 2010 and aired 105 episodes in seven seasons, concluding on September 5, 2016.

== Premise ==
The series' backstory is inspired by the Maura Isles/Jane Rizzoli series of novels by Tess Gerritsen. Rizzoli appears in the series' first novel, The Surgeon, and Isles is introduced in the second, The Apprentice, which serves as the basis for the television series.

Boston detective Jane Rizzoli has been investigating a serial killer named Charles Hoyt, a former medical student banned from medical school for fondling a corpse. He uses his medical knowledge to systematically torture and kill people, usually choosing couples to force one partner (usually the female) to watch the torture and murder of the other. Jane ascertains Hoyt's location, but as she is searching for him, she is hit in the back of the head and knocked unconscious. She is pinned to the floor by scalpels and awakes as Hoyt prepares to cut her throat, but Vince Korsak, Jane's partner, locates her and shoots Hoyt, not killing him, but saving Jane's life. Jane, reasoning that Korsak would never trust her as his partner after seeing her so vulnerable, applies for a new partner.

The series pilot, "See One. Do One. Teach One", is largely based on the novel The Apprentice. Jane and medical examiner Maura Isles investigate a killer with Hoyt's modus operandi plus an interest in necrophilia. Jane and Maura discover that the copycat was John Stark (Brendan McCarthy), a soldier who met Hoyt in medical school, had his identity erased for CIA black operations, and mimicked Hoyt's MO in a killing spree during said operations. Meanwhile, Hoyt escapes from prison and rejoins his apprentice to continue in killing. Later, Jane's home is broken into, and she is told by Stark, posing as part of BPD, that her neighbor had been killed. She rushes into the van to see the body, but finds Hoyt instead. Hoyt and Stark knock her out and kidnap her. When she wakes up they attempt to kill her, but she manages to disarm them by Tasing them and burning Hoyt's eye with a flare. In self-defense, she shoots the apprentice to death, and, when Hoyt reaches for her gun, she shoots him through the hands, giving him injuries similar to those he gave her.

New twists are introduced when Jane and Maura discover that a recent murder victim is actually Maura's previously unknown half-brother, resulting in her discovery that her biological father is notorious gangland criminal Patrick "Paddy" Doyle.

Hoyt returns 18 months later through another apprentice, Lola (real name Emily Stern) in "I'm Your Boogie Man". Having murdered Lola's abusive husband two years earlier, Hoyt uses her Stockholm syndrome, developed over six months in which she was kept in bondage, to his advantage and uses her to stalk Jane. Lola seduces and captures Frankie Rizzoli before tying Jane up. She plans to kidnap Jane until Hoyt can escape from prison, but Jane manages to distract Lola long enough for Frankie to kill Lola with her own revolver.

Hoyt returns again when he arranges for another inmate to be stabbed to lure Jane into the prison so that he can taunt her about another unsolved murder he committed, intending to finally make Jane and Maura his (last) victims before he dies of cancer. While speaking to Jane in the prison infirmary, Hoyt tells her to look at what he is reading — Tess Gerritsen's novel, The Silent Girl. Although she manages to find the bodies of his victims — the family of an old college professor of Hoyt's who was unaware of his expulsion — Hoyt, aided by yet another armed apprentice (a prison guard who was responsible for the stabbing that brought Jane back into his sphere), holds her and Maura hostage in his cell. Jane saves Maura and kills Hoyt by stabbing him. The apprentice is shot dead by arriving police.

== Cast and characters ==
=== Main ===
- Angie Harmon as Jane Clementine Rizzoli, a Boston detective in the Homicide Unit. From an Italian American family, Jane is brash, sarcastic, and often prickly but also a confident and independent woman as well as a brilliant detective. In the final season, Jane takes a new job as an instructor at the FBI Academy in Quantico, Virginia.
- Sasha Alexander as Dr. Maura Dorothea Isles, the Commonwealth of Massachusetts' Chief Medical Examiner. Isles is a forensic expert working at the Boston Police Department and Jane's best friend. Maura is socially awkward and cannot lie; if she does, she breaks out in hives.
- Lorraine Bracco as Angela Rizzoli: Jane, Frankie, and Tommy's overbearing and fiercely protective mother.
- Bruce McGill as Vincent "Vince" Walter Korsak, Rizzoli's former partner who is promoted to sergeant-detective in season two.
- Lee Thompson Young as Barold "Barry" Frost (seasons 1–4): Rizzoli's second partner. While adept with computers and technology, he is terrified of dead bodies and becomes ill at the sight of blood. In the season five premiere, Barry was killed in a car accident due to Young's death in 2013.
- Jordan Bridges as Francesco "Frankie" Rizzoli, Jr.: a police officer and Jane's protective younger brother. He looks up to Jane, but does not like feeling caught in her shadow as he tries to make his own way in the police force. In season four, Frankie is promoted to detective and begins taking night classes in computer science to increase his skill set in season five. In season seven, he begins a romantic relationship with Nina and eventually successfully proposes to her.
- Brian Goodman as Sean Cavanaugh (seasons 3–4; recurring, seasons 1–2, 5): the lieutenant of the Boston PD's Homicide Unit. Fiercely loyal to Jane and an old friend of Korsak, Sean is willing to bend the rules from time to time.
- Idara Victor as Nina Holiday (seasons 6–7; recurring, season 5): a crime scene analyst and computer technician. Formerly a detective in Chicago, Holiday transferred to Boston Homicide to hone her analytical skills in an office-based environment. She begins a romantic relationship with Frankie Rizzoli in the seventh season, and the two become engaged in the series finale.
- Adam Sinclair as Dr. Kent Drake (season 7; recurring, season 6): a lab technician, and Maura's new assistant starting in the sixth season. He is a Scot with a military background, having served in the Middle East. In the series finale, "Ocean-Frank", Kent is set to oversee the Commonwealth of Massachusetts' Medical Examiner's Office during Maura's sabbatical.

=== Recurring ===
- Annabeth Gish as Alice Sands, a former police academy classmate of Jane's who dropped out and turned to a life of crime after Jane usurped her position as top of the class.
- Tina Huang as Susie Chang, the senior criminalist of the Boston Police Department's crime laboratory. She has described herself as having a very physical memory. For example, when circumstances required her to take point in an investigation, she made various dioramas to explain her reasoning. In the third-season episode "Class Action Satisfaction", she is revealed to be a nudist. She is killed in the sixth-season episode, "Misconduct," as part of a complex plan to frame the forensics department for poor handling of a recent case, but the subsequent investigation exposed the killer's true agenda.
- Donnie Wahlberg as Lieutenant Joe Grant, an old rival of Jane's since childhood. He constantly made fun of her, calling her "Frog Face" and "Roly-Poly Rizzoli" because she was slightly chubby when she was younger. When he leaves for Washington, D.C. after being appointed as the liaison between Boston and Homeland Security, he claims that he has liked her for a very long time.
- John Doman as Patrick "Paddy" Doyle, an Irish-American crime boss and the biological father and protector of Maura Isles. To protect her from his diehard father, Paddy claimed Maura had died as a baby and made sure she was adopted.
- Jacqueline Bisset as Constance Isles, a visual artist and the adoptive mother of Dr. Maura Isles. She loves Maura but is sorry that they don't have a close relationship.
- Colin Egglesfield as Thomas "Tommy" Rizzoli, the well-meaning, good-looking but dim younger brother of Jane and Frankie. Convicted for running over a priest (non-fatally) in a crosswalk on his third DUI violation, he returns to the family fold following his release from prison. As of the season two episode "He Ain't Heavy, He's My Brother", he is 32 years old. He tries to kiss Maura to pay her back for her kindness, but she stops him and he develops a crush on her as he works on starting a new life. He later fathers a son, T.J., and grows up a lot.
- Chris Vance as Charles (Casey) Jones, an old flame of Jane's from high school, reunited with Jane during season two. A US Army officer assigned to the Middle East, he returns to Boston in season three but breaks up with Jane because of injuries that left him partially paralyzed below the waist. He returns in season four's first episode after a successful operation and proposes to Jane, but when he receives the offer of a promotion to colonel, he decides to stay in the army, leaving Jane behind.
- Darryl Alan Reed as Rondo, a man with access to information in the criminal world who becomes a confidential informant to Jane.
- Billy Burke as Gabriel Dean, an FBI agent often seen working with the Boston Homicide detectives and the Medical Examiner's Office. He later becomes romantically involved with Jane, but she ends this relationship when he tries to use her as part of a plan to capture Paddy Doyle, which forced Jane to shoot Paddy.
- Chazz Palminteri as Francesco "Frank" Rizzoli Sr., father of Jane, Frankie, and Tommy. He owns and runs a plumbing business called Rizzoli and Sons. He and Angela separate and then divorce after the first season. He later tries to have their marriage annulled so that he can remarry in a Catholic ceremony. He returns to announce he has stage 2 prostate cancer; despite the news, his family finds overlooking his past transgressions difficult.
- Matthew Del Negro as Giovanni Gilberti, a dimwitted former classmate of Jane's, now an auto mechanic.
- Michael Massee as Charles Hoyt, a sadistic serial killer who kidnapped and stabbed Jane in both hands and continues to threaten her, even from behind bars. Hoyt appears in several episodes, including "See One, Do One, Teach One" (episode 1), "I'm Your Boogie Man", and "Remember Me".
- Sharon Lawrence as Dr. Hope Martin, Maura's biological mother, who was told by Paddy Doyle that Maura died as a baby. She is a noted medical doctor with another, much-younger daughter, Cailin.
- Emilee Wallace as Cailin Martin, Hope's daughter and Maura's half-sister. Despite Caitlin's initial hostility, Maura later donated her kidney to Cailin to save her life.
- Alexandra Holden as Lydia Sparks, a ditzy young woman who is heavily pregnant when Angela befriends her. It is soon revealed that her child's father is either Angela's son, Tommy, or Angela's ex-husband, Frank. Eventually, a test confirms that Tommy is the father, and the boy is known as T.J. for "Tommy Junior."
- Jaz Sinclair as Tasha Williams (season 5), a high-school student who witnessed a shooting and was saved from the shooter by Jane.

== Production ==
The untitled project was on TNT's development slate as early as March 2008. In October 2009, TNT placed a cast-contingent pilot order under the original title, Rizzoli. The pilot script was written by Janet Tamaro. Angie Harmon was the first actress cast, taking the title role of police detective Jane Rizzoli. Sasha Alexander won the role of medical examiner Dr. Maura Isles after auditioning with Harmon. Bruce McGill signed as Rizzoli's former partner, Sgt. Vince Korsak. Lee Thompson Young was cast as her new partner, Barry Frost. The role of Rizzoli's younger brother Frankie was filled by Jordan Bridges. Lorraine Bracco signed on as Rizzoli's mother, Angela. In early 2010, Billy Burke was announced as FBI agent Gabriel Dean.

In late January 2010, TNT green-lighted the pilot to series with the new title Rizzoli & Isles. Ten episodes were ordered and the show premiered on July 12, 2010. Owing to a sponsorship deal between MillerCoors and Turner Broadcasting for the summer 2010 season, the series included product placement for MGD 64, including billboards in the backgrounds of some scenes. The first season was additionally sponsored by Vonage. After having aired three episodes in 2010, the series was renewed for a second season, which aired from July 11 to December 26, 2011. In August 2011, TNT ordered a third season, which aired from June 5 through December 25, 2012. On June 29, 2012, TNT ordered a fourth season, which aired from June 25, 2013, through March 18, 2014. On December 9, 2014, TNT renewed Rizzoli & Isles for an 18-episode sixth season.

In August 2013, production on the fourth season was suspended when cast member Lee Thompson Young was found dead at his Los Angeles apartment from a self-inflicted gunshot wound. In the second half of the fifth season, a new character, crime scene analyst Nina Holiday, played by Idara Victor, was introduced. Series executive producer Jan Nash stated that Nina would not replace Young's character, Frost. Instead, the existing characters were given "new dynamics", according to Nash. For example, Jane and Korsak work more cases together, and Frankie is more involved in solving cases.

The show was filmed primarily in Hollywood, Los Angeles at Paramount Pictures studios.

== Broadcast ==
Rizzoli & Isles started to air on GEM in Australia on November 29, 2010. The series started to air on Super Channel in Canada on October 5, 2010. On January 3, 2012, the series moved to Showcase.

The show has started to air on Calle 13 and Nova in Spain on May 11, 2011 and was broadcast on Fox Life in Portugal on June 29, 2011.

The series aired on Warner TV in Singapore on February 1, 2011, on M-Net Series and Universal Channel in South Africa on August 30, 2011, and on TVNorge in Norway on November 11, 2010.

Rizzoli & Isles started to air on Alibi in the United Kingdom on September 13, 2011. The second season premiered on January 26, 2012.

The series, shown in original broadcast order, began airing on Lifetime in September 2020 as well as Start TV in January 2021.

=== Streaming ===
Rizzoli & Isles was available to stream on Peacock beginning in July 2025, after previously being available on HBO Max until June 2024. The series is available to stream on Amazon Prime Video in the UK, Australia and Canada.

== Reception ==
=== Ratings ===
The series started strong in the ratings, as 7.55 million viewers tuned in for the premiere episode. Rizzoli & Isles was the second most-watched cable program on the evening of July 12, 2010, behind its lead-in, The Closer, which had 110,000 more viewers. The show finished the week in third behind The Closer and the final episode of Deadliest Catch.

The premiere set a record as the highest-rated debut for a commercial-supported cable series, and it was the second-highest debut ever for a basic cable TV series. Rizzoli & Isles is second only to the 2008 premiere of Raising the Bar, which attracted 7.7 million viewers during its commercial-free debut. Live + 7 day ratings for the premiere updated the show's status as the all-time most-watched cable series launch, with DVR viewers increasing the show's rating to just over 9 million viewers.

The show has ranked in the top five cable programs all five seasons and was the number one basic cable program in its fifth season.

Season	Time slot (EST)	Number of episodes	Premiere			Finale			TV season	Overall rank	Overall viewership
Season	Time slot (EST)	Number of episodes	Date	Viewers (millions)	18–49 Rating	Date	Viewers (millions)	18–49 Rating	TV season	Overall rank	Overall viewership
1	Monday 10:00 pm	10	July 12, 2010	7.55	2.1	September 13, 2010	6.56	1.5	2010	N/A	N/A
2	Monday 10:00 pm	15	July 11, 2011	6.38	1.2	December 26, 2011	5.79	1.1	2011	N/A	N/A
3	Tuesday 9:00 pm	15	June 5, 2012	5.62	1.2	December 25, 2012	4.42	0.8	2012	#3	7.40
4	Tuesday 9:00 pm	16	June 25, 2013	6.64	1.4	March 18, 2014	3.58	0.7	2013–14	N/A	N/A
5	Tuesday 9:00 pm	18	June 17, 2014	5.81	1.0	March 17, 2015	3.62	0.6	2014–15	N/A	N/A
6	Tuesday 9:00 pm	18	June 16, 2015	4.39	0.7	March 15, 2016	2.92	0.5	2015–16	N/A	N/A
7	Monday 9:00 pm	13	June 6, 2016	3.91	0.6	September 5, 2016	5.26	0.7	2016	TBA	TBA

=== Critical response ===
The show has been described as having lesbian undertones, and the purported sexual attraction between Rizzoli and Isles has been the subject of critical and fan attention, with sites such as The Advocate connecting the show's lesbian subtext to its popularity. Harmon said that she was not surprised by the attention and that, while it was "super fun" to play a role that has some same-sex romantic vibes, the characters are "straight" and "just best friends". Alexander said that she was not initially aware of the subtext but believed it reflected the characters' chemistry. She also expressed skepticism that Rizzoli and Isles' friendship was out of the ordinary.

Whilst the character of Dr Isles is not canonically autistic, her portrayal has been praised by critics and audiences as a positive representation of autism (especially in women). Sasha Alexander, the actress who portrayed Isles, has acknowledged her character as a "positive presentation" of autism spectrum disorder (formerly known as Asperger's), stating she is "so proud" of the public visibility this role provided to audiences with autism.

=== Awards and nominations ===
Year	Association	Category	Recipient(s)	Result
2012	Young Artist Awards	Best Performance in a TV Series – Guest Starring Young Actor 18–21	Cameron Monaghan	Nominated
2014	People's Choice Awards	Favorite Cable TV Actress	Angie Harmon	Nominated
2015	People's Choice Awards	Favorite Cable TV Actress	Angie Harmon	Won
2015	People's Choice Awards	Favorite Cable TV Drama	Rizzoli & Isles	Nominated
2016	People's Choice Awards	Favorite Cable TV Actress	Sasha Alexander	Won

== See also ==
- Cagney & Lacey
- Scott & Bailey
