= Ballistics =

Science of the motion of projectiles

Trajectories of three objects thrown at the same angle (70°): Stokes' drag Newtonian drag No form of drag and moves along a parabola

Ballistics is the field of mechanics concerned with the launching, flight behaviour and impact effects of projectiles, especially weapon munitions such as bullets, unguided bombs, rockets and the like; the science or art of designing and accelerating projectiles so as to achieve a desired performance.

A ballistic body is a free-moving body with momentum, which can be subject to forces such as those exerted by pressurized gases from a gun barrel or a propelling nozzle, normal force by rifling, and gravity and air drag during flight.

A ballistic missile is a missile that is guided only during the relatively brief initial phase of powered flight, with the trajectory subsequently governed by the laws of classical mechanics, in contrast to (for example) a cruise missile, which is aerodynamically guided in powered flight like a fixed-wing aircraft.

== History and prehistory ==
The earliest known ballistic projectiles were stones, spears, and the throwing stick.

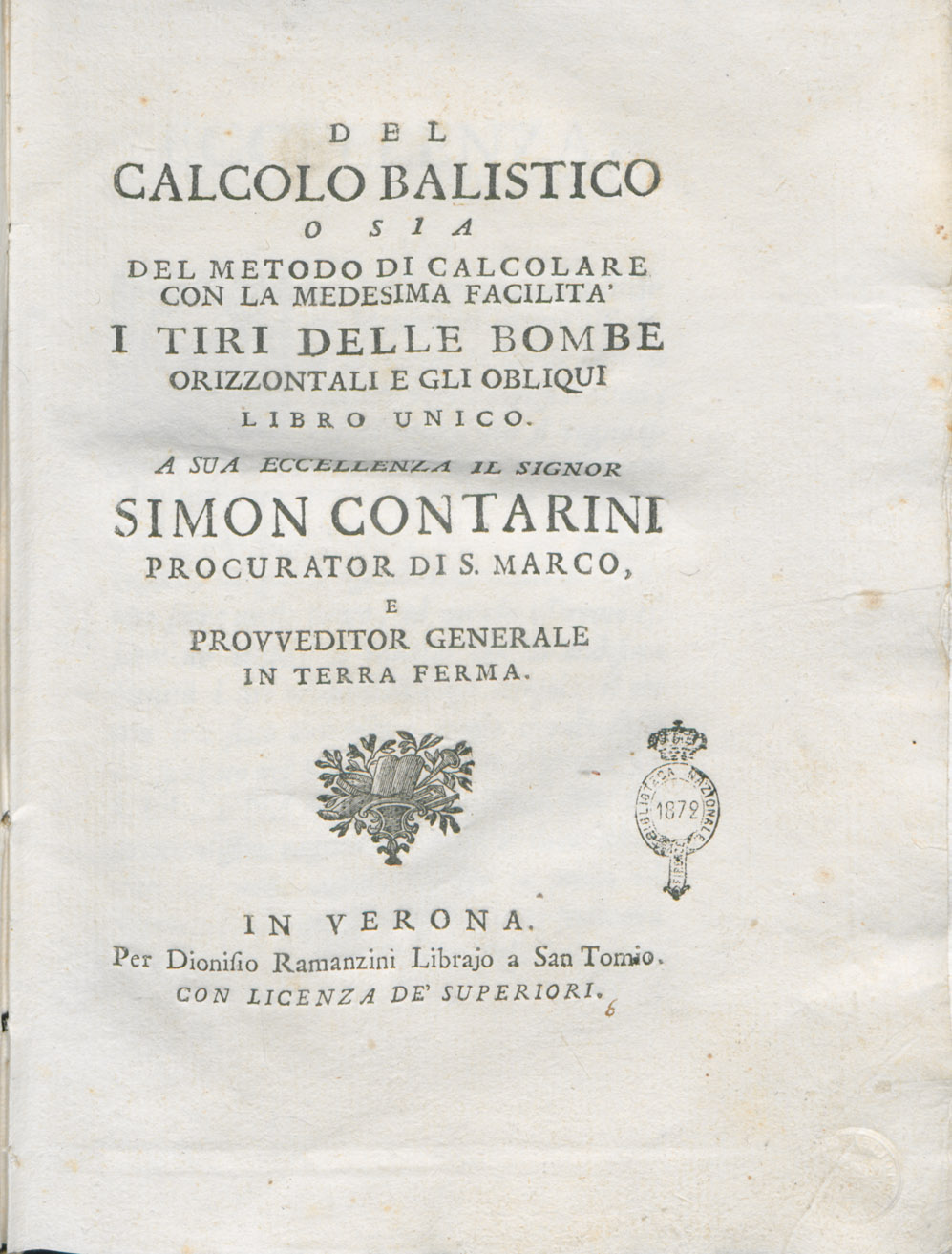
Gaetano Marzagaglia, Del calcolo balistico, 1748

The oldest evidence of stone-tipped projectiles, which may or may not have been propelled by a bow (cf. atlatl), dating to c. 280,000 years ago, were found in Ethiopia, present day East Africa. The oldest evidence of the use of bows to shoot arrows dates to about 10,000 years ago; it is based on pinewood arrows found in the Ahrensburg valley north of Hamburg. They had shallow grooves on the base, indicating that they were shot from a bow. The oldest bow so far recovered is about 8,000 years old, found in the Holmegård swamp in Denmark.

Archery seems to have arrived in the Americas with the Arctic small tool tradition, about 4,500 years ago.

The first devices identified as guns appeared in China around 1000 AD, and by the 12th century the technology was spreading through the rest of Asia, and into Europe by the 13th century.

After millennia of empirical development, the discipline of ballistics was initially studied and developed by Italian mathematician Niccolò Tartaglia in 1531, although he continued to use segments of straight-line motion, conventions established by the Greek philosopher Aristotle and Albert of Saxony, but with the innovation that he connected the straight lines by a circular arc. Galileo established the principle of compound motion in 1638, using the principle to derive the parabolic form of the ballistic trajectory. Ballistics was put on a solid scientific and mathematical basis by Isaac Newton, with the publication of Philosophiæ Naturalis Principia Mathematica in 1687. This gave mathematical laws of motion and gravity which for the first time made it possible to successfully predict trajectories.

The word ballistics comes from the Greek βάλλειν ballein, meaning "to throw".

== Projectiles ==
A projectile is any object projected into space (empty or not) by the exertion of a force. Although any object in motion through space (for example a thrown baseball) is a projectile, the term most commonly refers to a weapon. Mathematical equations of motion are used to analyze projectile trajectory.

Examples of projectiles include balls, arrows, bullets, artillery shells, wingless rockets, etc.

== Projectile launchers ==
=== Throwing ===
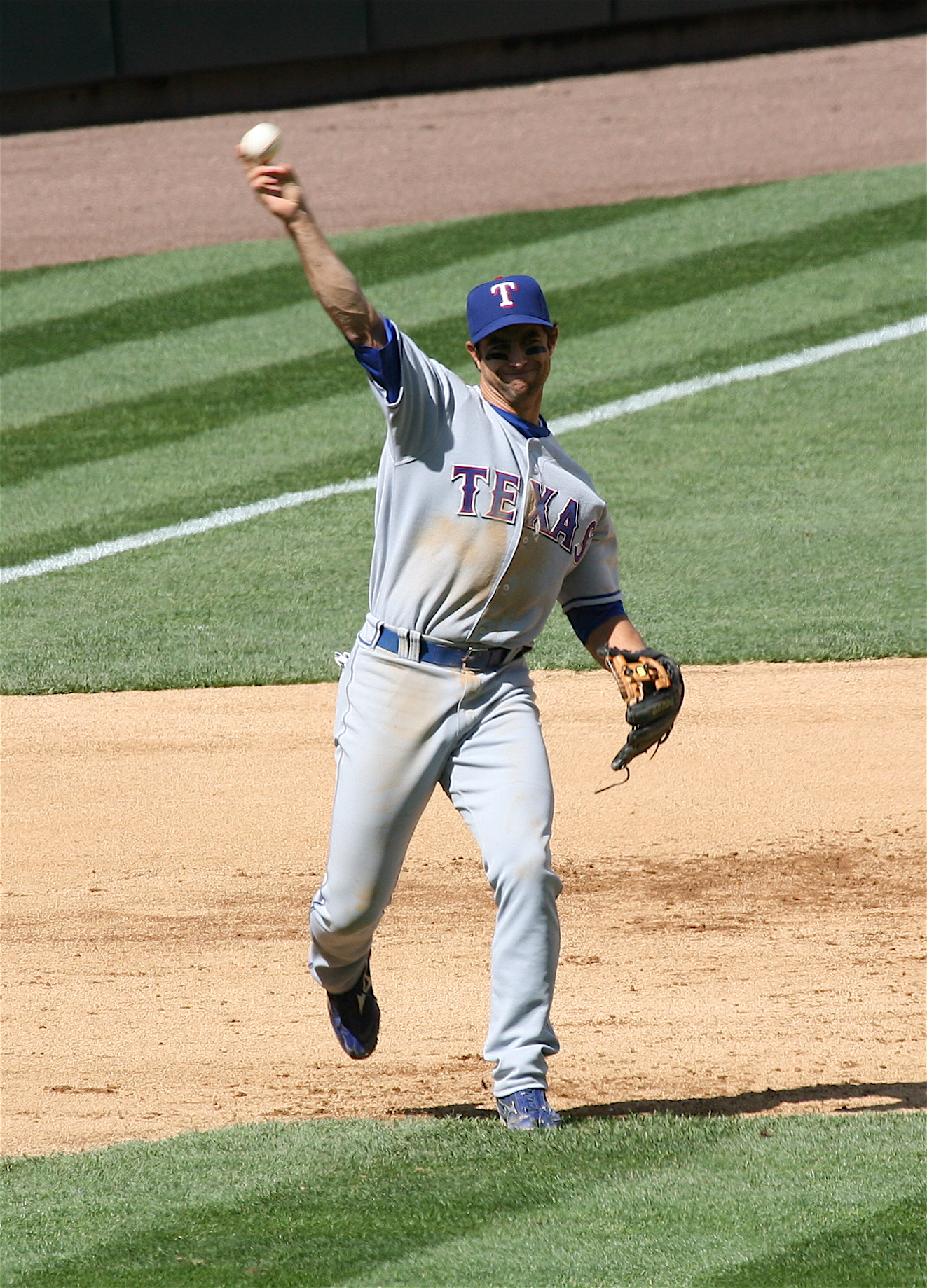
Baseball throws can exceed 100 mph.

Throwing is the launching of a projectile by hand. Although some other animals can throw, humans are unusually good throwers due to their high dexterity and good timing capabilities, and it is believed that this is an evolved trait. Evidence of human throwing dates back 2 million years. The 145 km/h (90 mph) throwing speed found in many athletes far exceeds the speed at which chimpanzees can throw things, which is about 32 km/h (20 mph). This ability reflects the ability of the human shoulder muscles and tendons to store elasticity until it is needed to propel an object.

=== Sling ===
A sling is a projectile weapon typically used to throw a blunt projectile such as a stone, clay or lead "sling-bullet".

A sling has a small cradle or pouch in the middle of two lengths of cord. The sling stone is placed in the pouch. The middle finger or thumb is placed through a loop on the end of one cord, and a tab at the end of the other cord is placed between the thumb and forefinger. The sling is swung in an arc, and the tab released at a precise moment. This frees the projectile to fly to the target.

=== Bow ===
A bow is a flexible piece of material which shoots aerodynamic projectiles called arrows. The arrow is perhaps the first lethal projectile ever described in discussion of ballistics. A string joins the two ends and when the string is drawn back, the ends of the stick are flexed. When the string is released, the potential energy of the flexed stick is transformed into the velocity of the arrow. Archery is the art or sport of shooting arrows from bows.

=== Catapult ===
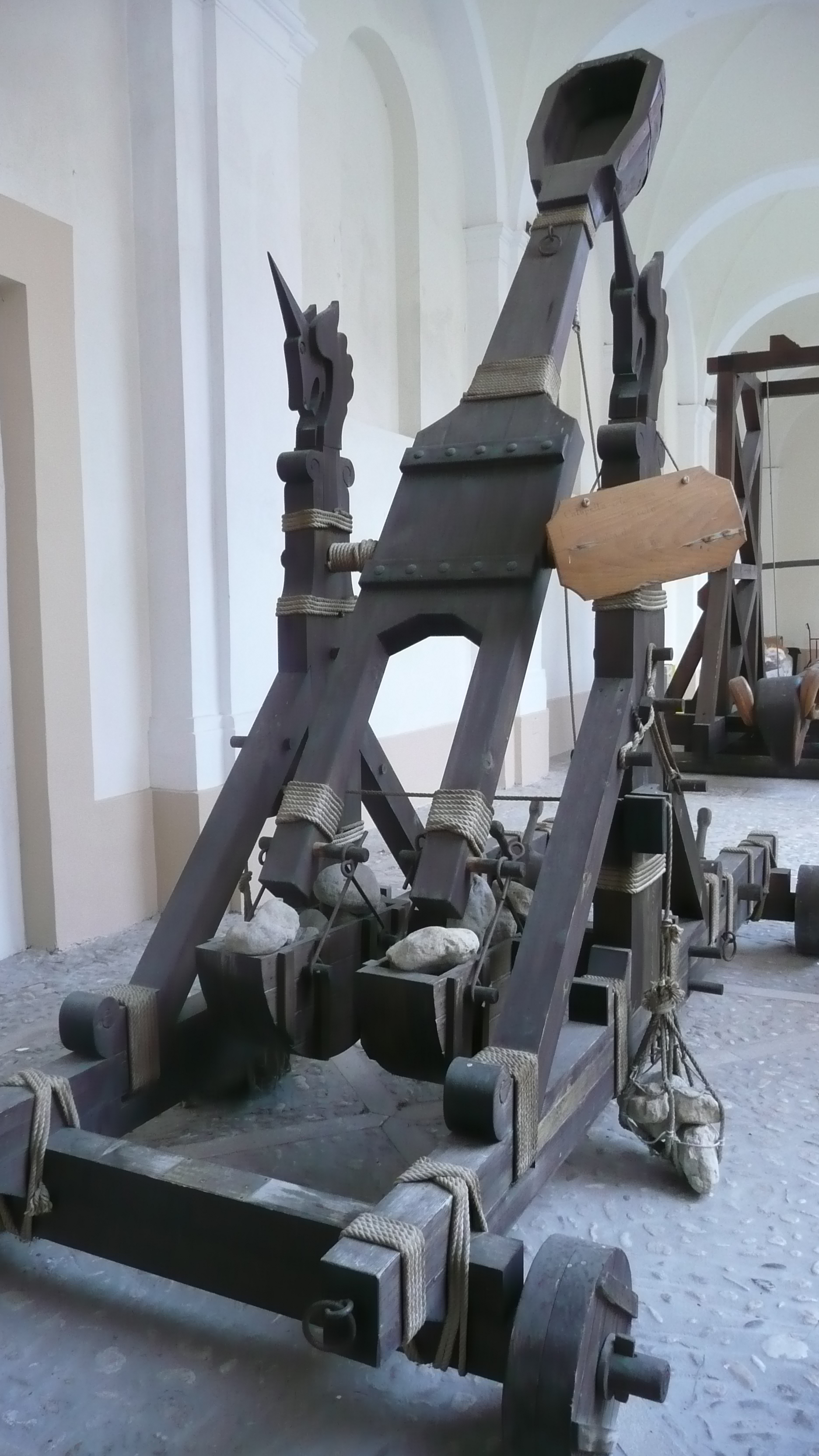
Catapult 1 Mercato San Severino

A catapult is a device used to launch a projectile a great distance without the aid of explosive devices – particularly various types of ancient and medieval siege engines. The catapult has been used since ancient times, because it was proven to be one of the most effective mechanisms during warfare. The word "catapult" comes from the Latin catapulta, which in turn comes from the Greek καταπέλτης (katapeltēs), itself from κατά (kata), "against” and πάλλω (pallō), "to toss, to hurl". Catapults were invented by the ancient Greeks.

=== Gun ===
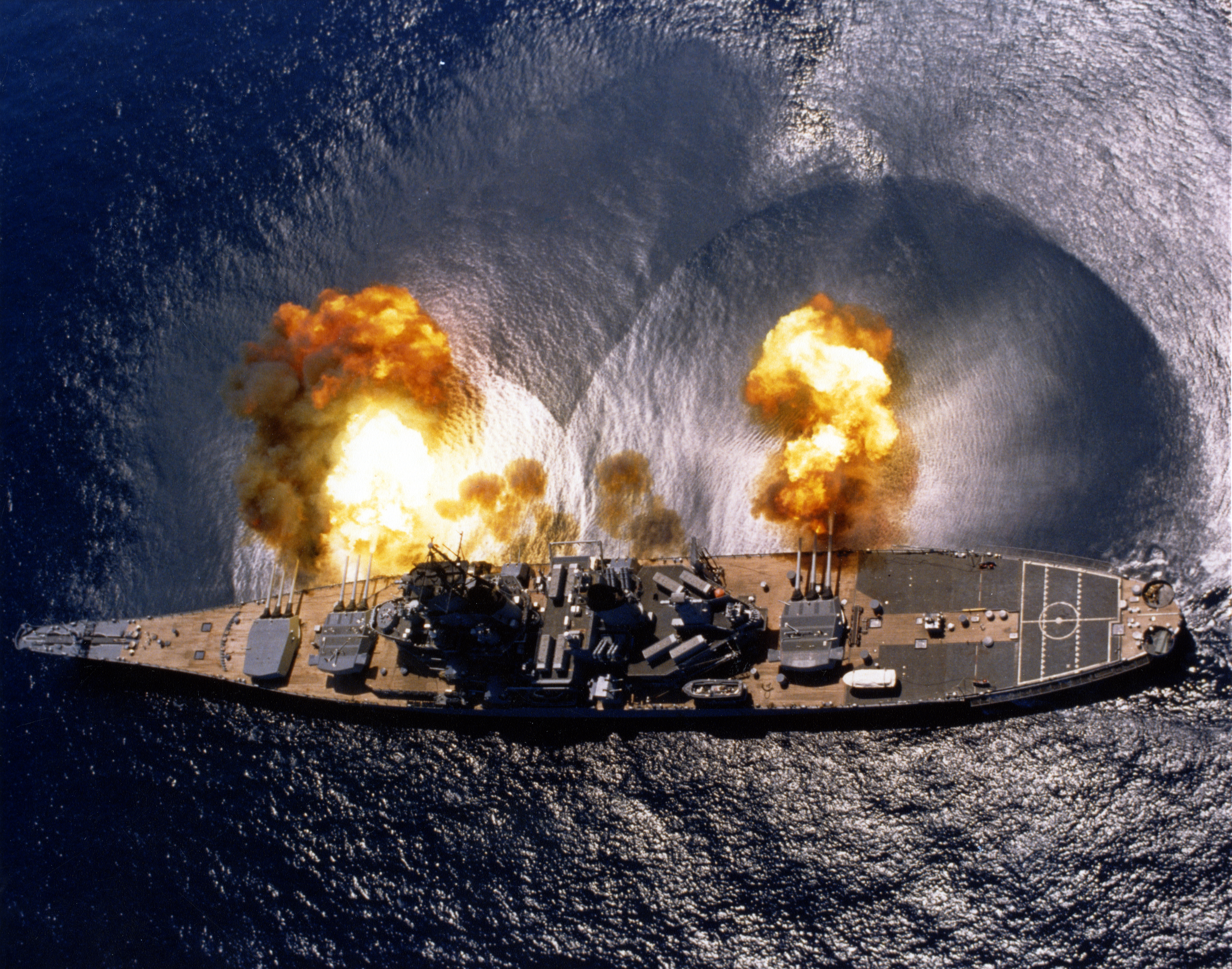
USS Iowa (BB-61) fires a full broadside 1984.

A gun is a normally tubular weapon or other device designed to discharge projectiles or other material. The projectile may be solid, liquid, gas, or energy and may be free, as with bullets and artillery shells, or captive as with Taser probes and whaling harpoons. The means of projection varies according to design but is usually effected by the action of gas pressure, either produced through the rapid combustion of a propellant or compressed and stored by mechanical means, operating on the projectile inside an open-ended tube in the fashion of a piston. The confined gas accelerates the movable projectile down the length of the tube imparting sufficient velocity to sustain the projectile's travel once the action of the gas ceases at the end of the tube or muzzle. Alternatively, acceleration via electromagnetic field generation may be employed in which case the tube may be dispensed with and a guide rail substituted.

A weapons engineer or armourer who applies the scientific principles of ballistics to design cartridges is often called a ballistician.

=== Rocket ===
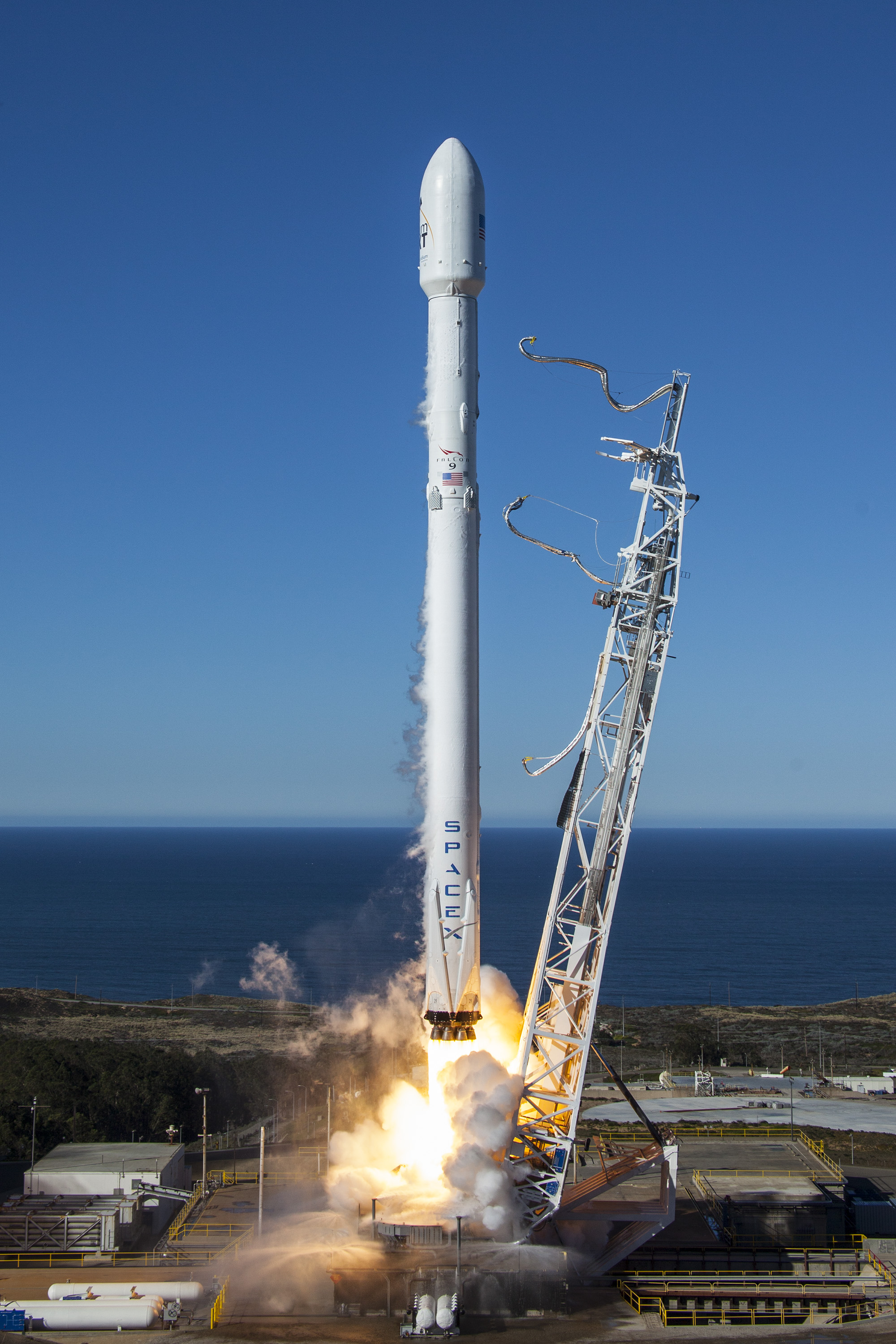
SpaceX's Falcon 9 Full Thrust rocket, 2017

A rocket is a missile, spacecraft, aircraft or other vehicle that obtains thrust from a rocket engine. Rocket engine exhaust is formed entirely from propellants carried within the rocket before use. Rocket engines work by action and reaction. Rocket engines push rockets forward simply by throwing their exhaust backwards extremely fast.

While comparatively inefficient for low speed use, rockets are relatively lightweight and powerful, capable of generating large accelerations and of attaining extremely high speeds with reasonable efficiency. Rockets are not reliant on the atmosphere and work very well in space.

Rockets for military and recreational uses date back to at least 13th century China. Significant scientific, interplanetary and industrial use did not occur until the 20th century, when rocketry was the enabling technology for the Space Age, including setting foot on the Moon. Rockets are now used for fireworks, weaponry, ejection seats, launch vehicles for artificial satellites, human spaceflight, and space exploration.

Chemical rockets are the most common type of high performance rocket and they typically create their exhaust by the combustion of rocket propellant. Chemical rockets store a large amount of energy in an easily released form, and can be very dangerous. However, careful design, testing, construction and use minimizes risks.

== Subfields ==
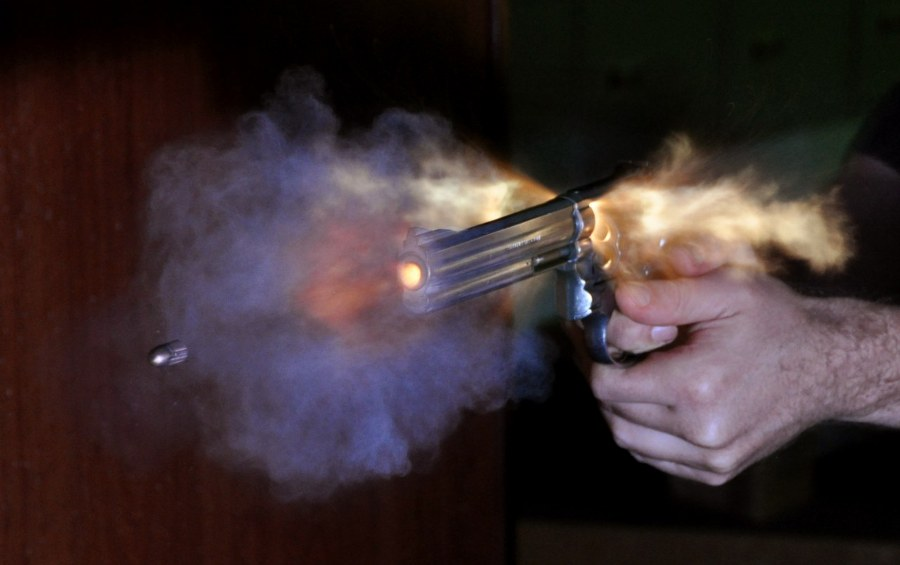
Ballistics can be studied using high-speed photography or high-speed cameras. A photo of a Smith & Wesson revolver firing, taken with an ultra high speed air-gap flash. Using this sub-microsecond flash, the bullet can be imaged without motion blur.

Ballistics is often broken down into the following four categories:

- Internal ballistics the study of the processes originally accelerating projectiles
- Transition ballistics the study of projectiles as they transition to unpowered flight
- External ballistics the study of the passage of the projectile (the trajectory) in flight
- Terminal ballistics the study of the projectile and its effects as it ends its flight

=== Internal ballistics ===
Internal ballistics (also interior ballistics), a sub-field of ballistics, is the study of the propulsion of a projectile.

In guns, internal ballistics covers the time from the propellant's ignition until the projectile exits the gun barrel. The study of internal ballistics is important to designers and users of firearms of all types, from small-bore rifles and pistols, to high-tech artillery.

For rocket propelled projectiles, internal ballistics covers the period during which a rocket engine is providing thrust.

=== Transitional ballistics ===
Transitional ballistics, also known as intermediate ballistics, is the study of a projectile's behavior from the time it leaves the muzzle until the pressure behind the projectile is equalized, so it lies between internal ballistics and external ballistics.

=== External ballistics ===
Schlieren image of a bullet travelling in free-flight demonstrating the air pressure dynamics surrounding the bulle

External ballistics is the part of the science of ballistics that deals with the behaviour of a non-powered projectile in flight.

External ballistics is frequently associated with firearms, and deals with the unpowered free-flight phase of the bullet after it exits the gun barrel and before it hits the target, so it lies between transitional ballistics and terminal ballistics.

However, external ballistics is also concerned with the free-flight of rockets and other projectiles, such as balls, arrows etc.

=== Terminal ballistics ===
Terminal ballistics is the study of the behavior and effects of a projectile when it hits its target.

Terminal ballistics is relevant both for small caliber projectiles as well as for large caliber projectiles (fired from artillery). The study of extremely high velocity impacts is still very new and is as yet mostly applied to spacecraft design.

== Applications ==
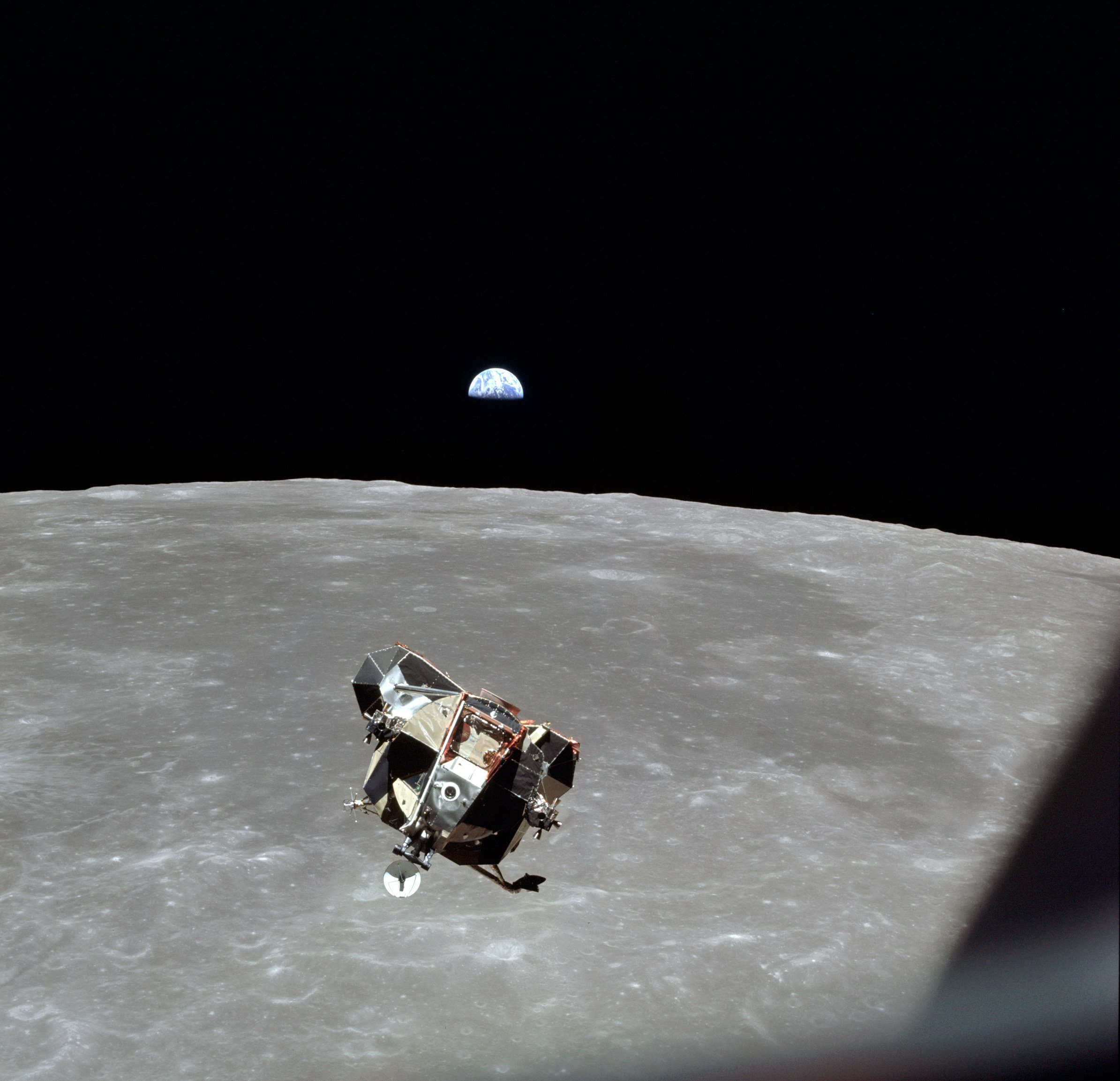
Apollo 11 – Astrodynamic calculations have permitted spacecraft to travel to and return from the Moon.

=== Forensic ballistics ===
Forensic ballistics involves analysis of bullets and bullet impacts to determine information of use to a court or other part of a legal system. Separately from ballistics information, firearm and tool mark examinations ("ballistic fingerprinting") involve analyzing firearm, ammunition, and tool mark evidence in order to establish whether a certain firearm or tool was used in the commission of a crime.

=== Astrodynamics ===
Astrodynamics is the application of ballistics and celestial mechanics to the practical problems concerning the motion of rockets and other spacecraft. The motion of these objects is usually calculated from Newton's laws of motion and Newton's law of universal gravitation. It is a core discipline within space mission design and control.

== See also ==
- Armour
- Ballistic conduction (related to electron transport)
- Ballistic limit
- Ballistic trauma
- Bloodstain pattern analysis
- Circular error probable
- Gunshot residue
- Hydrostatic shock
- L.T.E. Thompson
- Microscopes and ballistics
- Peter Bielkowicz
- Physics of firearms
- Projectile motion
- Spallation
- Stopping power
- Vaporific effect
