= List of body armor performance standards =

Body armor performance standards are lists generated by national authorities, of requirements for armor to perform reliably, clearly indicating what the armor may and may not defeat. Different countries have different standards, which may include threats that are not present in other countries.

== VPAM armor standard (International) ==
The VPAM scale as of 2009 runs from 1 to 14; 1-5 is soft and 6-14 is hard. Tested armor must withstand three hits, spaced 120 mm (4.7 inches) apart, of the designated test threat with no more than 25 mm (0.98 inches) of back-face deformation in order to pass. Of note is the inclusion of special regional threats such as Swiss P AP from RUAG and .357 DAG. According to VPAM's website, it is apparently used in France and Britain.

The VPAM scale is as follows:

Armor Level	Protection
PM 1.22 Long Rifle	This armor would protect against three hits, fired from 10±0.5 meters, of: 2.6±0.1 g (40±1.54 gr) .22 Long Rifle lead round-nose bullets at a velocity of 360±10 m/s (1181±33 ft/s)
PM 2 9×19mm Parabellum	This armor would protect against three hits, fired from 5±0.5 meters, of: 8.0±0.1 g (123±1.54 gr) 9×19mm Parabellum DM41 FMJ round-nose lead-core bullets at a velocity of 360±10 m/s (1181±33 ft/s)
PM 3 9×19mm Parabellum	This armor would protect against three hits, fired from 5±0.5 meters, of: 8.0±0.1 g (123±1.54 gr) 9×19mm Parabellum DM41 FMJ round-nose lead-core bullets at a velocity of 415±10 m/s (1361±33 ft/s)
PM 4.357 Magnum.44 Magnum	This armor would protect against three hits, fired from 5±0.5 meters, of: 10.2±0.1 g (157±1.54 gr) .357 Magnum bullets at a velocity of 430±10 m/s (1410±33 ft/s); 15.6±0.1 g (240±1.54 gr) .44 Magnum bullets at a velocity of 440±10 m/s (1443±33 ft/s)
PM 5.357 Magnum	This armor would protect against three hits, fired from 5±0.5 meters, of: 7.1±0.1 g (109±1.54 gr) .357 Magnum FMs (brass at nose) bullets at a velocity of 580±10 m/s (1902±33 ft/s)
PM 6 7.62×39mm	This armor would protect against three hits, fired from 10±0.5 meters, of: 8.0±0.1 g (122±1.54 gr) 7.62×39mm PS mild steel-core bullets at a velocity of 720±10 m/s (2362±33 ft/s)
PM 7 5.56×45mm 7.62×51mm	This armor would protect against three hits, fired from 10±0.5 meters, of: 4.0±0.1 g (62±1.54 gr) 5.56×45mm SS109/US: M855 FMJ bullets at a velocity of 950±10 m/s (3116±33 ft/s); 9.55±0.1 g (147±1.54 gr) 7.62×51mm DM111 steel-core bullets at a velocity of 830±10 m/s (2723±33 ft/s)
PM 8 7.62×39mm	This armor would protect against three hits, fired from 10±0.5 meters, of: 7.7±0.1 g (118±1.54 gr) 7.62×39mm BZ API (armor-piercing incendiary) bullets at a velocity of 740±10 m/s (2427±33 ft/s)
PM 9 7.62×51mm	This armor would protect against three hits, fired from 10±0.5 meters, of: 9.7±0.2 g (149±3.08 gr) 7.62×51mm P80 armor-piercing bullets at a velocity of 820±10 m/s (2690±33 ft/s)
PM 10 7.62×54mmR	This armor would protect against three hits, fired from 10±0.5 meters, of: 10.4±0.1 g (160±1.54 gr) 7.62×54mmR B32 API bullets at a velocity of 860±10 m/s (2821±33 ft/s)
PM 11 7.62×51mm	This armor would protect against three hits, fired from 10±0.5 meters, of: 8.4±0.1 g (129±1.54 gr) 7.62×51mm Nammo AP8/US M993 armor-piercing bullets at a velocity of 930±10 m/s (3051±33 ft/s)
PM 12 7.62×51mm	This armor would protect against three hits, fired from 10±0.5 meters, of: 12.7±0.1 g (196±1.54 gr) 7.62×51mm RUAG SWISS P AP armor-piercing bullets at a velocity of 810±10 m/s (2657±33 ft/s)
PM 13 12.7×99mm	This armor would protect against three hits, fired from an arbitrary distance, of: 43.5±0.1 g (671±7.71 gr) 12.7×99mm RUAG SWISS P penetrator bullets at a velocity of 930±10 m/s (3051±33 ft/s)
PM 14 14.5×114mm	This armor would protect against three hits, fired from an arbitrary distance, of: 63.4±0.1 g (978±7.71 gr) 14.5×114mm B32 API bullets at a velocity of 911±10 m/s (2988±33 ft/s)

== TR armor standard (Germany) ==
The Technische Richtlinie (TR) Ballistische Schutzwesten is a regulation guide in Germany for body armor. It is mainly issued for body armor used by the German police, but also for the German armed forces and civilian available body armor. Producers have to meet the criteria of the TR, if they want to participate in open competitive bidding made by German agencies. The TR specifies different Schutzklassen (SK), which translates to protection classes, which a body armor can have. It specifies five different classes ranging from L to 4 of ballistic protection (e.g. SK 4). It also gives specifications for additional Stichschutz (ST), protection against knives, using the same classes as the ballistic protection, but giving it the additional ST label (e.g. SK L ST). The ballistic tests to determine a class are now integrated into the VPAM guidelines, so that the tests differ just in minor details and only one test (SK 1) is significantly different as of 2008.

The TR scale is as follows:

Armor Level	Protection
SK L 9×19mm Parabellum	This test is based on VPAM PM 2, but it tests also for point-blank shots. This armor would protect against three hits, fired from 5±0.5 meters, as well as point-blank shots, of: 8.0±0.1 g (123±1.54 gr) 9×19mm Parabellum DM41 FMJ round-nose lead-core bullets at a velocity of 360±10 m/s (1181±33 ft/s)
SK 1 9×19mm Parabellum	This test is based on VPAM PM 3, but it adds two police special rounds, with the following modifications: This armor would protect against three hits, fired from 5±0.5 meters in an angle of 25°, as well as 3 shots at point-blank, of: 8.0±0.1 g (123±1.54 gr) 9×19mm Parabellum DM41 FMJ round-nose lead-core bullets at a velocity of 415±10 m/s; 6.0±0.1 g 9×19mm Parabellum QD-PEP II/S police special round bullets at a velocity of 460±10 m/s; 6.1±0.1 g 9×19mm Parabellum Action 4 police special round bullets at a velocity of 460±10 m/s
SK 2 (PM 5).357 Magnum	This armor would protect against three hits, fired from 5±0.5 meters, of: 7.1±0.1 g (109±1.54 gr) .357 Magnum FMs (brass at nose) bullets at a velocity of 580±10 m/s (1902±33 ft/s)
SK 3 (PM 7) 5.56×45mm 7.62×51mm	This armor would protect against three hits, fired from 10±0.5 meters, of: 4.0±0.1 g (62±1.54 gr) 5.56×45mm SS109/US: M855 FMJ bullets at a velocity of 950±10 m/s (3116±33 ft/s); 9.55±0.1 g (147±1.54 gr) 7.62×51mm DM111 steel-core bullets at a velocity of 830±10 m/s (2723±33 ft/s)
SK 4 (PM 9) 7.62×51mm	This armor would protect against three hits, fired from 10±0.5 meters, of: 9.7±0.2 g (149±3.08 gr) 7.62×51mm P80 armor-piercing bullets at a velocity of 820±10 m/s (2690±33 ft/s)

The German TR are generally comparable to the American NIJ, but the German TR usually tests more threat scenarios, as there are no point-blank shots as well as no police special rounds. In contrast the NIJ tests for bigger calibers and higher man stopping power. And while the German TR tests smaller calibers and lighter bullets, it also tests more aggressive rounds, as the first test already uses steel FMJ bullets, while the NIJ uses normal FMJ rounds. In addition SK 4, the highest protection class, is specified to withstand three hits, while Level IV needs only to withstand one hit - although by a bigger caliber (7.62×63mm).

== HOSDB armor standard (United Kingdom) ==
The Home Office Scientific Development Branch is governing standards and testing protocols for police body armor.

Armor Level	Protection
HG1/A	This armor would protect against six (three for S-sized panel) hits, fired from 5 meters, of: 8.0±0.1 g (123±1.54 gr) 9×19mm Parabellum DM11 FMJ round-nose lead-core bullets at a velocity of 365±10 m/s; 10.2±0.1 g (158±1.54 gr) .357 Magnum R375M3 JSP bullets at a velocity of 390±10 m/s
HG1	This armor would protect against six (three for S-sized panel) hits, fired from 5 meters, of: 8.0±0.1 g (123±1.54 gr) 9×19mm Parabellum DM11 FMJ round-nose lead-core bullets at a velocity of 365±10 m/s; 10.2±0.1 g (158±1.54 gr) .357 Magnum R375M3 JSP bullets at a velocity of 390±10 m/s
HG2	This armor would protect against six (three for S-sized panel) hits, fired from 5 meters, of: 8.0±0.1 g (123±1.54 gr) 9×19mm Parabellum DM11 FMJ round-nose lead-core bullets at a velocity of 390±10 m/s; 10.2±0.1 g (158±1.54 gr) .357 Magnum R375M3 JSP bullets at a velocity of 430±10 m/s
HG3	This armor would protect against six (three for S-sized panel) hits, fired from 10 meters, of: 4.0±0.1 g (62±1.54 gr) 5.56×45mm LE223T3 bullets at a velocity of 750±15 m/s (3116±33 ft/s)
RF1	This armor would protect against three hits, fired from 10 meters, of: 9.3±0.1 g (144±1.54 gr) 7.62×51mm L2A2 FMJ bullets at a velocity of 830±15 m/s (2723±33 ft/s)
RF2	This armor would protect against three hits, fired from 10 meters, of: 9.7±0.1 g (150±1.54 gr) 7.62×51mm L40A2 steel-core bullets at a velocity of 850±15 m/s (2723±33 ft/s)
SG3	This armor would protect against 1 hit, fired from 10 meters, of: 28.4±0.1 g (437±1.54 gr) 12 gauge rifled lead slug at a velocity of 435±25 m/s

BFD (Back Face Deformation) to be measured after each shot, maximum allowed BFD for HG1/A class is 44 mm (1.7 in) and 25 mm (0.98 in) for the rest.

== GOST armor standard (Russia) ==
GOST R 50744-95 is the Russian Federation standard for body armor. Prior to the 2017 revision, the threat levels ran from 1 to 6. Noticeably, it included threats with the suffix A, which denote heightened ratings as opposed to lowered ratings in the NIJ standard.

The old (pre-2017) standards are as follows:

Armor Level	Protection
Class 1 9×18mm Makarov 7.62×38mmR	This armor would protect against five hits, fired from 5 meters, of: 5.9 g (91 gr) 9×18mm Makarov 57-N-181S steel-core bullets at a velocity of 305–325 m/s (1000–1066 ft/s); 6.8 g (105 gr) 7.62×38mmR 57-N-122 lead core bullets at a velocity of 275–295 m/s (902–968 ft/s).
Class 2 5.45×18mm 7.62×25mm Tokarev	This armor would protect against five hits, fired from 5 meters, of: 2.5 g (38.6 gr) 5.45×18mm steel-core MPC 7N7 bullets at a velocity of 310–335 m/s (1017–1099 ft/s); 5.5 g (84.8 gr) 7.62×25mm Tokarev steel-core bullets at a velocity of 415–445 m/s (1361–1460 ft/s)
Class 2A 12 gauge	This armor would protect against five hits, fired from 5 meters, of: 35 g (540 gr) 12 gauge lead-core "Hunter" shotshells at a velocity of 390–410 m/s (1279–1345 ft/s)
Class 3 5.45×39mm 7.62×39mm	This armor would protect against three hits, fired from 5.10 meters, of: 3.4 g (52 gr) 5.45×39mm 7N6 (PS) hardened steel-core bullets at a velocity of 890–910 m/s (2920–2985 ft/s); 7.9 g (122 gr) 7.62×39mm 57-N-231 (PS) hardened steel-core bullets at a velocity of 710–740 m/s (2329–2427 ft/s)
Class 4 5.45×39mm	This armor would protect against three hits, fired from 5.10 meters, of: 3.4 g (52 gr) 5.45×39mm 7N10 (PP) hardened steel-core bullets at a velocity of 890–910 m/s (2920–2985 ft/s)
Class 5 7.62×54mmR 7.62×39mm	This armor would protect against three hits, fired from 5.10 meters, of: 9.6 g (148 gr) 7.62×54mmR 57-N-323S steel-core bullets at a velocity of 820–840 m/s (2690–2756 ft/s); 7.9 g (122 gr) 7.62×39mm 57-N-231 (PS) hardened steel-core bullets at a velocity of 710–740 m/s (2329–2427 ft/s)
Class 5A 7.62×39mm	This armor would protect against three hits, fired from 5.10 meters, of: 7.4 g (114 gr) 7.62×39mm 57-BZ-231 (BZ API) armor-piercing incendiary bullets at a velocity of 720–750 m/s (2362–2460 ft/s).
Class 6 7.62×54mmR	This armor would protect against three hits, fired from 5.10 meters, of: 9.6 g (148 gr) 7.62×54mmR ST-M2 hardened steel-core bullets at a velocity of 820–840 m/s (2690–2756 ft/s)
Class 6A 7.62×54mmR	This armor would protect against three hits, fired from 5.10 meters, of: 10.4 g (160 gr) 7.62×54mmR 7-BZ-3 (B32 API) armor-piercing incendiary bullets at a velocity of 800–835 m/s (2624–2739 ft/s)

With the 2017 revision, the standards have changed significantly. Threat classes now range from BR1 to BR6. 'A'-suffixed classes have been eliminated, and their test threats have been either merged into the new categories, such as Classes 6 and 6A being moved into Class BR5, or removed entirely, as in the case of Class 2A. Additionally, several of the threat levels have been increased in difficulty with the introduction of new test threats; most notably is the introduction of Class BR6, which requires the tested armor to survive three hits of 12.7×108mm B32 API. In spite of the more difficult test threats, the 16 mm (0.63 in) back-face deformation limit remains unchanged.

The updated standards from the 2017 revision are as follows:

Armor Level	Protection
BR1 9×18mm Makarov	This armor would protect against five hits, fired from 5±0.1, meters of: 5.9 g (91 gr) 9×18mm Makarov 57-N-181S steel-core bullets from a Stechkin APS at a velocity of 335±10 m/s (1199±33 ft/s)
BR2 9×21mm Gyurza	This armor would protect against five hits, fired from 5±0.1 meters, of: 7.93 g (122 gr) 9×21mm Gyurza 7N28 lead-core bullets from an SR-1 Vektor at a velocity of 390±10 m/s (1279±33 ft/s)
BR3 9×19mm Parabellum	This armor would protect against five hits, fired from 5±0.1 meters, of: 5.2 g (80 gr) 9×19mm Parabellum 7N21 hardened steel-core bullets from an MP-443 Grach at a velocity of 455±10 m/s (1492±33 ft/s)
BR4 5.45×39mm 7.62×39mm	This armor would protect against three hits, fired from 10±0.1 meters, of: 3.4 g (52 gr) 5.45×39mm 7N10 (PP) hardened steel-core bullets from an AK-74 at a velocity of 895±15 m/s (2936±49 ft/s); 7.9 g (122 gr) 7.62×39mm 57-N-231 (PS) hardened steel-core bullets from an AKM at a velocity of 720±15 m/s (2362±49 ft/s)
BR5 7.62×54mmR	This armor would protect against three hits, fired from 10±0.1 meters, of: 9.4 g (148 gr) 7.62×54mmR 7N13 (PP) hardened steel-core bullets from a SVD sniper rifle at a velocity of 830±15 m/s (2723±49 ft/s); 7.9 g (122 gr) 7.62×54mmR 7BZ3 API (armor-piercing incendiary) bullets from a SVD sniper rifle at a velocity of 810±15 m/s (2657±49 ft/s)
BR6 12.7×108mm	This armor would protect against three hits, fired from 50±0.5 meters, of: 48.2 g (743.8 gr) 12.7×108mm 57-BZ-542 API (armor-piercing incendiary) bullets from an OSV-96 sniper rifle at a velocity of 830±20 m/s (2723±65 ft/s).

== NIJ armor standard (United States) ==
=== Ballistic resistance (before April 2024) ===
NIJ Standard-0101.06 had specific performance standards for bullet resistant vests used by law enforcement. This rated vests on the following scale against penetration and also blunt trauma protection (deformation):

Armor Level	Protection
Level I.22 LR.380 ACP	This armor would protect against: 2.6 g (40 gr) .22 Long Rifle Lead Round Nose (LR LRN) bullets at a velocity of 329 m/s (1080 ft/s ± 30 ft/s); 6.2 g (95 gr) .380 ACP Full Metal Jacketed Round Nose (FMJ RN) bullets at a velocity of 322 m/s (1055 ft/s ± 30 ft/s).; It is no longer part of the standard.
Level IIA 9×19mm.40 S&W.45 ACP	New armor protects against: 8 g (124 gr) 9×19mm Parabellum Full Metal Jacketed Round Nose (FMJ RN) bullets at a velocity of 373 m/s ± 9.1 m/s (1225 ft/s ± 30 ft/s); 11.7 g (180 gr) .40 S&W Full Metal Jacketed (FMJ) bullets at a velocity of 352 m/s ± 9.1 m/s (1155 ft/s ± 30 ft/s); 14.9 g (230 gr) .45 ACP Full Metal Jacketed (FMJ) bullets at a velocity of 275 m/s ± 9.1 m/s (900 ft/s ± 30 ft/s).; Conditioned armor protects against: 8 g (124 gr) 9 mm FMJ RN bullets at a velocity of 355 m/s ± 9.1 m/s (1165 ft/s ± 30 ft/s); 11.7 g (180 gr) .40 S&W FMJ bullets at a velocity of 325 m/s ± 9.1 m/s (1065 ft/s ± 30 ft/s); 14.9 g (230 gr) .45 ACP Full Metal Jacketed (FMJ) bullets at a velocity of 259 m/s ± 9.1 m/s (850 ft/s ± 30 ft/s).; It also provides protection against the threats mentioned in [Type I].
Level II 9mm +P.357 Magnum	New armor protects against: 8 g (124 gr) 9 mm FMJ RN bullets at a velocity of 398 m/s ± 9.1 m/s (1305 ft/s ± 30 ft/s); 10.2 g (158 gr) .357 Magnum Jacketed Soft Point bullets at a velocity of 436 m/s ± 9.1 m/s (1430 ft/s ± 30 ft/s).; Conditioned armor protects against: 8 g (124 gr) 9 mm FMJ RN bullets at a velocity of 379 m/s ±9.1 m/s (1245 ft/s ± 30 ft/s); 10.2 g (158 gr) .357 Magnum Jacketed Soft Point bullets at a velocity of 408 m/s ±9.1 m/s (1340 ft/s ± 30 ft/s).; It also provides protection against the threats mentioned in [Types I and IIA].
Level IIIA.357 SIG.44 Magnum	New armor protects against: 8.1 g (125 gr) .357 SIG FMJ Flat Nose (FN) bullets at a velocity of 448 m/s ± 9.1 m/s (1470 ft/s ± 30 ft/s); 15.6 g (240 gr) .44 Magnum Semi Jacketed Hollow Point (SJHP) bullets at a velocity of 436 m/s (1430 ft/s ± 30 ft/s).; Conditioned armor protects against: 8.1 g (125 gr) .357 SIG FMJ Flat Nose (FN) bullets at a velocity of 430 m/s ± 9.1 m/s (1410 ft/s ± 30 ft/s); 15.6 g (240 gr) .44 Magnum Semi Jacketed Hollow Point (SJHP) bullets at a velocity of 408 m/s ± 9.1 m/s (1340 ft/s ± 30 ft/s).; It also provides protection against most handgun threats, as well as the threats mentioned in [Types I, IIA, and II].
Level III 7.62×51mm NATO M80	Conditioned armor protects against: 9.6 g (148 gr) 7.62×51mm NATO M80 ball bullets at a velocity of 847 m/s ± 9.1 m/s (2780 ft/s ± 30 ft/s).; It also provides protection against the threats mentioned in [Types I, IIA, II, and IIIA].
Level IV.30-06 Springfield M2	Conditioned armor protects against: 10.8 g (166 gr) .30-06 Springfield M2 armor-piercing (AP) bullets at a velocity of 878 m/s ± 9.1 m/s (2880 ft/s ± 30 ft/s).; It also provides at least single hit protection against the threats mentioned in [Types I, IIA, II, IIIA, and III].

"Special Threats" were ratings of armor which provide protection against specific projectiles. For example, the NIJ guidelines did not have any specification for armor that can stop M855 steel core ammunition. As a result, some manufacturers designated specific armors as "Level III+" (a designation not recognized by the NIJ) to specify armor which had up to level III protection and could protect against special threats like the M855, but did not provide level IV protection.

=== Ballistic resistance (after April 2024) ===
In April 2024, NIJ began testing with NIJ Standard-0101.07 in conjunction with NIJ Standard-0123.00. NIJ Standard-0101.07 outlines testing procedures, while NIJ Standard-0123.00 describes ballistic protection levels. These standards completely replaced the NIJ Standard-0101.06. HG is rated for handgun threats and RF is rated for rifle threats.

The ballistic protection levels outlined in NIJ Standard 0123.00 are as follows:

Armor Level	Protection
NIJ HG1 9mm Luger.357 Magnum	This armor must protect against: 124 gr (8.0 g) 9mm Luger Full Metal Jacketed Round Nose (FMJ RN) at a velocity of 1,305 ft/s (398 m/s).; 158 gr (10.2 g) .357 Magnum Jacketed Soft Point (JSP) at a velocity of 1,430 ft/s (440 m/s).; This is roughly equivalent to the obsolete NIJ Level II ballistic protection level.
NIJ HG2 9mm Luger.44 Magnum	This armor must protect against: 124 gr (8.0 g) 9mm Luger Full Metal Jacketed Round Nose (FMJ RN) at a velocity of 1,470 ft/s (450 m/s).; 240 gr (16 g) .44 Magnum Jacketed Hollow Point (JHP) at a velocity of 1,430 ft/s (440 m/s).; This is roughly equivalent to the obsolete NIJ Level IIIA ballistic protection level.
NIJ RF1 7.62×51mm NATO 7.62×39mm 5.56×45mm NATO	This armor must protect against: 147 gr (9.5 g) 7.62x51mm NATO M80 Ball Full Metal Jacketed (FMJ) Steel Jacket at a velocity of 2,780 ft/s (850 m/s).; 123 gr (8.0 g) 7.62x39mm Type 56 Mild Steel Core (MSC) Ball ammunition at a velocity of 2,400 ft/s (730 m/s).; 56 gr (3.6 g) 5.56x45mm NATO M193 at a velocity of 3,250 ft/s (990 m/s).; This is roughly equivalent to the obsolete NIJ Level III ballistic protection level. 7.62x51mm and 5.56x45mm projectiles may be up to 2 gr (0.13 g) lighter than values given.
NIJ RF2 7.62×51mm NATO 7.62×39mm 5.56×45mm NATO	This armor must protect against: 147 gr (9.5 g) 7.62x51mm NATO M80 Ball Full Metal Jacketed (FMJ) Steel Jacket at a velocity of 2,780 ft/s (850 m/s).; 123 gr (8.0 g) 7.62x39mm Type 56 Mild Steel Core (MSC) Ball ammunition at a velocity of 2,400 ft/s (730 m/s).; 56 gr (3.6 g) 5.56x45mm NATO M193 at a velocity of 3,250 ft/s (990 m/s).; 61.8 gr (4.00 g) (±1.5 gr) 5.56x45mm NATO M855 at a velocity of 3,115 ft/s (949 m/s).; This is identical to the ballistic protection provided by NIJ RF1, with the addition of 5.56x45mm M855. This level has no equivalent in obsolete NIJ Standard-0101.06.
NIJ RF3.30-06 Springfield	This armor must protect against: 165.7 gr (10.74 g) .30-06 M2 Armor Piercing (AP) bullets at a velocity of 2,880 ft/s (880 m/s).; This is roughly equivalent to the obsolete NIJ Level IV ballistic protection level. Projectile may be up to 7 gr (0.45 g) lighter than value given.

NIJ standards are used for law enforcement armors. Armor used by the United States military is not required to be tested under NIJ standards. Textile armor is tested for both penetration resistance by bullets and for the impact energy transmitted to the wearer.

=== Backface deformation ===
Backface deformation is defined in NIJ Standard-0101.07 as "the indentation in the backing material caused by a projectile impact on the test item during testing". It is measured by shooting armor mounted in front of a backing material, typically oil-based modeling clay. The clay is used at a controlled temperature and verified for impact flow before testing. After the armor is impacted with the test bullet, the vest is removed from the clay and the depth of the indentation in the clay is measured.

=== Conditioned armor ===
Some armor tested under NIJ Standard-0101.07 is conditioned before testing, meaning it has been subjected to stress factors such as submersion, vibration, or impacts. These stress factors have been shown in some cases to degrade the performance of some armor material. The test-round velocity for conditioned armor is the same as that for unconditioned armor during testing, whereas in the previous standard the velocities would have varied. For example, under NIJ Standard-0101.06, conditioned Level IIIA would have been shot with a .44 Magnum round at 408 m/s (1,340 ft/s), while unconditioned Level IIIA would have been shot at 436 m/s (1,430 ft/s). Under NIJ Standard-0101.07, the velocity used for testing conditioned and unconditioned armor is the same. Armor conditioning procedures are outlined in ASTM E3078 Standard Practice for Conditioning of Hard Armor Test Items.

Generally, textile armor material temporarily degrades when wet. As a result of this, the major test standards call for wet testing of textile armor. Mechanisms for this loss of performance are not known. Neutral water at room temp has not been shown in testing to negatively affect the performance of para-aramid or UHMWPE but acidic, basic and some other solutions can permanently reduce para-aramid fiber tensile strength.

From 2003 to 2005, a large study of the environmental degradation of Zylon armor was undertaken by the US-NIJ. This concluded that water, long-term use, and temperature exposure significantly affect tensile strength and the ballistic performance of PBO or Zylon fiber. This NIJ study on vests returned from the field demonstrated that environmental effects on Zylon resulted in ballistic failures under standard test conditions.

=== Stab resistance ===
The NIJ's stab resistance standards (Standard–0115.00) define three levels of protection:

- Level 1 armor is low-level protection suitable for extended wear and is usually covert. This armor protects against stab threats with a strike energy of 24±0.50 J (17.7±0.36 ft·lbf). The overtest condition for this level is 36±0.60 J (26.6±0.44 ft·lbf).
- Level 2 armor is medium-level protection suitable for extended wear and may be either overt or covert. This armor protects against stab threats with a strike energy of 33±0.60 J (24.3±0.44 ft·lbf). The overtest condition for this level is 50±0.70 J (36.9±0.51 ft·lbf).
- Level 3 is high-level protection suitable for wear in high risk situations and is usually overt. This armor protects against stab threats with a strike energy of 43±0.60 J (31.7±0.44 ft·lbf). The overtest condition for this level is 65±0.80 J (47.9±0.59 ft·lbf).

For all three levels, the maximum blade or spike penetration allowed is 7 mm (0.28 in), with this limit being determined through research indicating that internal injuries to organs would be extremely unlikely at this depth of penetration. The overtest condition, which is intended to ensure an adequate margin of safety in the armor design, permits a maximum blade or spike penetration of 20 mm (0.79 in).

The standard does not directly address slash resistance and instead notes that, since stab threats are more difficult to defeat, any armor that can defeat a stab threat will also defeat a slash threat.

== US military armor standards ==
Although the US military requirements for body armor mirror the NIJ's on a surface level, the two are very different systems. The two systems share a 44 mm (1.7 in) limit on back-face deformation, but SAPI-series plates increase linearly in protection (with each plate tested against the preceding plate's threats), and require a soft armor backer in order to reach their stated level of protection.

Armor Type:	Protection:
Soft Armor Fragmentation 9×19mm FMJ	US Army soft armor inserts adhere to standards specified under FQ/PD 07–05. They are required to stop the following ballistic and fragmentation threats: 2-grain (0.13 g) RCC (Right Circular Cylinder) at a velocity (V_{50}) of 2,710-foot-per-second (830 m/s) when dry and 2,575-foot-per-second (785 m/s) when wet.; 4-grain (0.26 g) RCC at a velocity of 2,400-foot-per-second (730 m/s) (V_{50}) when dry and 2,300-foot-per-second (700 m/s) (V_{50}) when wet.; 16-grain (1.0 g) RCC at a velocity of 2,050-foot-per-second (620 m/s) (V_{50}) when dry and 1,920-foot-per-second (590 m/s) (V_{50}) when wet.; 64-grain (4.1 g) RCC at a velocity of 1,660-foot-per-second (510 m/s) (V_{50}) when dry and 1,610-foot-per-second (490 m/s) (V_{50}) when wet.; 16-grain (1.0 g) RCC at a velocity of 2,000-foot-per-second (610 m/s) (V_{50}) after hot and cold temperature exposure and accelerated aging.; 16-grain (1.0 g) RCC at a velocity of 1,900-foot-per-second (580 m/s) (V_{50}) after contamination with motor oil and JP-8.; 17-grain (1.1 g) Fragment Simulating Projectile (FSP) at a velocity of 1,850-foot-per-second (560 m/s) (V_{50}) when dry.; 124-grain (8.0 g) 9×19mm Remington FMJ at a velocity of 1,400-foot-per-second (430 m/s)+50-foot-per-second (15 m/s) (V_{0}) and 1,525-foot-per-second (465 m/s) (V_{50}).
SAPI 7.62×51mm 7.62×54mmR 5.56×45mm	SAPI plates were the first ballistic plates to see mass issue in the US military. They have a black fabric cover with white text. These plates adhere to CO/PD 00-03 and are rated to stop the following threats: 3 shots of 147-grain (9.5 g) 7.62×51mm M80 ball bullets at a velocity of 2,750-foot-per-second (840 m/s)+50-foot-per-second (15 m/s) (V_{0}).; 3 shots of 147-grain (9.5 g) 7.62×54mmR LPS steel-core FMJ bullets at a velocity of 2,300-foot-per-second (700 m/s)+50-foot-per-second (15 m/s) (V_{0}).; 3 shots of 62-grain (4.0 g) 5.56×45mm M855 bullets at a velocity of 3,250-foot-per-second (990 m/s)+50-foot-per-second (15 m/s) (V_{0}).
ISAPI 7.62×51mm 7.62×54mmR 5.56×45mm 7.62×39mm API	ISAPI (Improved SAPI) plates were designed as an upgrade to SAPI in the face of API threats in Iraq. They were superseded by ESAPI plates before they could be widely issued. These plates are rated to stop the following threats: 3 shots of 147-grain (9.5 g) 7.62×51mm M80 ball bullets at a velocity of 2,750-foot-per-second (840 m/s)+50-foot-per-second (15 m/s) (V_{0}).; 3 shots of 147-grain (9.5 g) 7.62×54mmR LPS steel-core FMJ bullets at a velocity of 2,300-foot-per-second (700 m/s)+50-foot-per-second (15 m/s) (V_{0}).; 3 shots of 62-grain (4.0 g) 5.56×45mm M855 bullets at a velocity of 3,250-foot-per-second (990 m/s)+50-foot-per-second (15 m/s) (V_{0}).; 3 shots of 114-grain (7.4 g) 7.62×39mm 57-BZ-231 (BZ API) armor-piercing incendiary bullets at a velocity of 2,400-foot-per-second (730 m/s)+50-foot-per-second (15 m/s) (V_{0}).
ESAPI (Revs. A-E) 7.62×51mm 7.62×54mmR 5.56×45mm.30-06 Springfield AP	ESAPI plates were developed in response to increased threats posed by 7.62×54mmR AP threats in Iraq and Afghanistan. They have a green fabric cover with white text. Original ESAPI plates, as well as those from Revisions B through D have the text "7.62mm APM2 Protection" on the back; Rev. E plates have the text "ESAPI - REV. E". The early-model plates are rated to stop the following threats: 3 shots of 147-grain (9.5 g) 7.62×51mm M80 ball bullets at a velocity of 2,750-foot-per-second (840 m/s)+50-foot-per-second (15 m/s) (V_{0}).; 3 shots of 147-grain (9.5 g) 7.62×54mmR LPS steel-core FMJ bullets at a velocity of 2,750-foot-per-second (840 m/s)+50-foot-per-second (15 m/s) (V_{0}).; 3 shots of 62-grain (4.0 g) 5.56×45mm M855 bullets at a velocity of 3,250-foot-per-second (990 m/s)+50-foot-per-second (15 m/s) (V_{0}).; 2 shots of 166-grain (10.8 g) .30-06 M2 AP armor-piercing bullets at a velocity of 2,850-foot-per-second (870 m/s)+50-foot-per-second (15 m/s) (V_{0}).
ESAPI (Rev. G) 7.62×51mm 7.62×54mmR 5.56×45mm.30-06 Springfield AP 7.62×54mmR 7N1 5.56×45mm AP	With the issuance of CO/PD 04-19H on 4 March 2013, the ESAPI protection standards improved significantly. These plates are indicated by the text "ESAPI - REV. G" on the back and are rated to stop the following threats: 3 shots of 147-grain (9.5 g) 7.62×51mm M80 ball bullets at a velocity of 2,750-foot-per-second (840 m/s)+50-foot-per-second (15 m/s) (V_{0}) and 2,850-foot-per-second (870 m/s) (V_{50} - combined).; 3 shots of 147-grain (9.5 g) 7.62×54mmR LPS steel-core FMJ bullets at a velocity of 2,750-foot-per-second (840 m/s)+50-foot-per-second (15 m/s) (V_{0}) and 2,850-foot-per-second (870 m/s) (V_{50} - combined).; 3 shots of 62-grain (4.0 g) 5.56×45mm M855 bullets at a velocity of 3,250-foot-per-second (990 m/s)+50-foot-per-second (15 m/s) (V_{0}) and 3,350-foot-per-second (1,020 m/s) (V_{50} - combined).; 3 shots of 166-grain (10.8 g) .30-06 M2 AP armor-piercing bullets at a velocity of 2,850-foot-per-second (870 m/s)+50-foot-per-second (15 m/s) (V_{0}).; 3 shots of 151-grain (9.8 g) 7.62×54mmR 7N1 "Sniper" steel-core bullets at a velocity of 2,700-foot-per-second (820 m/s)+50-foot-per-second (15 m/s) (V_{0}).; 3 shots of 55-grain (3.6 g) 5.56×45mm M995 AP bullets at a velocity of 3,350-foot-per-second (1,020 m/s)+50-foot-per-second (15 m/s) (V_{0}).
ESAPI (Rev. J) 7.62×54mmR.30-06 Springfield AP 7.62×54mmR 7N1 5.56×45mm AP	With the issuance of CO/PD 04-19REV J on 1 October 2018, the ESAPI protection standards were changed again. The protection requirements from 7.62×51mm NATO M80 ball and 5.56×45mm M855 were removed, and a high first-shot V_{50} requirement was added for the .30-06 M2 AP projectile. These plates are indicated by the text "ESAPI - REV. J" on the back and are rated to stop the following threats: 3 shots of 147-grain (9.5 g) 7.62×54mmR LPS steel-core FMJ bullets at a velocity of 2,750-foot-per-second (840 m/s)+50-foot-per-second (15 m/s) (V_{0}) and 2,850-foot-per-second (870 m/s) (V_{50} - combined).; 3 shots of 166-grain (10.8 g) .30-06 M2 AP armor-piercing bullets at a velocity of 2,850-foot-per-second (870 m/s)+50-foot-per-second (15 m/s) (V_{0}) and 3,000-foot-per-second (910 m/s) (V_{50} - first shot only).; 3 shots of 151-grain (9.8 g) 7.62×54mmR 7N1 "Sniper" steel-core bullets at a velocity of 2,700-foot-per-second (820 m/s)+50-foot-per-second (15 m/s) (V_{0}).; 3 shots of 55-grain (3.6 g) 5.56×45mm M995 AP bullets at a velocity of 3,350-foot-per-second (1,020 m/s)+50-foot-per-second (15 m/s) (V_{0}).
XSAPI 7.62×51mm 7.62×54mmR 7.62×39mm API.30-06 Springfield AP 7.62×54mmR 7N1 7.62×51mm AP 5.56×45mm AP	XSAPI plates were developed in response to a perceived threat of AP projectiles in Iraq and Afghanistan. Over 120,000 inserts were procured; however, the AP threats they were meant to stop never materialized, and the plates were put into storage. XSAPI plates have a tan fabric cover with black text. Early plates have the text "7.62 mm AP/WC Protection" inscribed on the back; on newer variants, this text instead reads "XSAPI - REV. B" or "XSAPI - REV. C". These plates adhere to FQ/PD 07-03 and are rated to stop between three and six shots at velocities between 2,750-foot-per-second (840 m/s) and 3,350-foot-per-second (1,020 m/s) (V_{0}) depending on threat type.

Armor is tested using a standard set of test methods under ARMY MIL-STD-662F and STANAG 2920 Ed2. The Department of Defense armor programs-of-record (Modular Tactical Vest for example) procure armor using these test standards. In addition, special requirements can be defined under this process such as flexible rifle protection, fragment protection for the extremities, etc.

== GA141 armor standard (China) ==
The Chinese Ministry of Public Security has maintained GA141, a standard document for describing the ballistic resistance of police armor, since 1996. As of 2023, the latest revision is GA141-2010. The standard defines the following grades using domestic weapons:

Armor Level	Protection
GA 1 7.62×17mm	Copper-jacketed bullet of 4.87 g (0.172 oz) mass at 320±10 m/s, as shot from a type 64 or Type 77 pistol.
GA 2 7.62×25mm Tokarev (Pistol)	Copper-jacketed bullet of 5.6 g (0.20 oz) mass at 445±10 m/s, as shot from a Type 54 pistol.
GA 3 7.62×25mm Tokarev (SMG)	Same bullet as above, but with a velocity of 515±10 m/s, as shot from a Type 79 submachine gun.
GA 4 7.62×25mm Tokarev AP (SMG)	Steel-cored bullet of 5.68 g (0.200 oz) mass at 515±10 m/s, as shot from a Type 79 submachine gun.
GA 5 7.62×39mm	Steel-core bullet, 8.05 g (0.284 oz) mass at 725±10 m/s, as shot from a Type 56 assault rifle or Type 81 assault rifle.
GA 6 7.62×54mmR	Steel-core bullet, 9.6 g (0.34 oz) mass at 830±10 m/s, as shot from a type 79 or type 85 sniper rifle.

Levels higher than 6 are marked "special". Levels 1 through 5 are to be tested with 6 shots. Level 6 is to be tested with 2 shots.

Annex A describes the use of GA grades against other "common" threats. 9×18mm Makarov is assigned to GA 1, 9×19mm to GA 2, 9×19mm AP (steel) and 5.8×21mm DAP92 AP to GA 4, 5.8×42mm DBP87 to GA 6, and "type 53" 7.62×54mmR API to "special grade".

== Ballistic testing V50 and V0 ==
Measuring the ballistic performance of armor is based on determining the kinetic energy of a bullet at impact (E_{k} = 1/2 mv^{2}). Because the energy of a bullet is a key factor in its penetrating capacity, velocity is used as the primary independent variable in ballistic testing. For most users the key measurement is the velocity at which no bullets will penetrate the armor. Measuring this zero penetration velocity (v_{0}) must take into account variability in armor performance and test variability. Ballistic testing has a number of sources of variability: the armor, test backing materials, bullet, casing, powder, primer and the gun barrel, to name a few.

Variability reduces the predictive power of a determination of V0. If for example, the v_{0} of an armor design is measured to be 1,600 ft/s (490 m/s) with a 9 mm FMJ bullet based on 30 shots, the test is only an estimate of the real v_{0} of this armor. The problem is variability. If the v_{0} is tested again with a second group of 30 shots on the same vest design, the result will not be identical.

Only a single low velocity penetrating shot is required to reduce the v_{0} value. The more shots made the lower the v_{0} will go. In terms of statistics, the zero penetration velocity is the tail end of the distribution curve. If the variability is known and the standard deviation can be calculated, one can rigorously set the V0 at a confidence interval. Test Standards now define how many shots must be used to estimate a v_{0} for the armor certification. This procedure defines a confidence interval of an estimate of v_{0}. (See "NIJ and HOSDB test methods".)

v_{0} is difficult to measure, so a second concept has been developed in ballistic testing called the ballistic limit (v_{50}). This is the velocity at which 50 percent of the shots go through and 50 percent are stopped by the armor. US military standard MIL-STD-662F V50 Ballistic Test define a commonly used procedure for this measurement. The goal is to get three shots that penetrate that are slower than a second faster group of three shots that are stopped by the armor. These three high stops and three low penetrations can then be used to calculate a v_{50} velocity.

In practice this measurement of v_{50} requires 1–2 vest panels and 10–20 shots. A very useful concept in armor testing is the offset velocity between the v_{0} and v_{50}. If this offset has been measured for an armor design, then v_{50} data can be used to measure and estimate changes in v_{0}. For vest manufacturing, field evaluation and life testing both v_{0} and v_{50} are used. However, as a result of the simplicity of making v_{50} measurements, this method is more important for control of armor after certification.

== Military testing: fragment ballistics ==
After the Vietnam War, military planners developed a concept of "Casualty Reduction". The large body of casualty data made clear that in a combat situation, fragments, not bullets, were the most important threat to soldiers. After WWII, vests were being developed and fragment testing was in its early stages. Artillery shells, mortar shells, aerial bombs, grenades, and antipersonnel mines are all fragmentation devices. They all contain a steel casing that is designed to burst into small steel fragments or shrapnel, when their explosive core detonates. After considerable effort measuring fragment size distribution from various NATO and Soviet bloc munitions, a fragment test was developed. Fragment simulators were designed, and the most common shape is a right circular cylinder or RCC simulator. This shape has a length equal to its diameter. These RCC Fragment Simulation Projectiles (FSPs) are tested as a group. The test series most often includes 2 grain (0.13 g), 4 grain (0.263 g), 16 grain (1.0 g), and 64 grain (4.2 g) mass RCC FSP testing. The 2-4-16-64 series is based on the measured fragment size distributions.

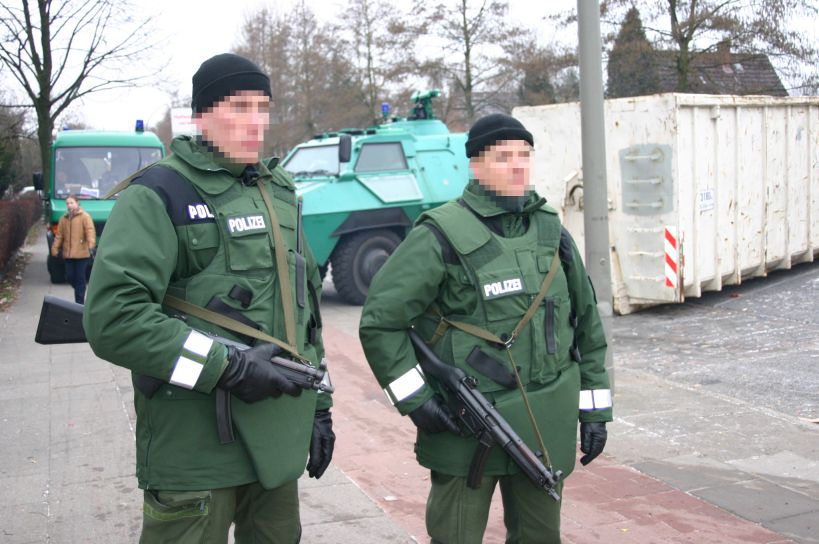
German policemen in bulletproof vests on guard duty at a military hospital

The second part of "Casualty Reduction" strategy is a study of velocity distributions of fragments from munitions. Warhead explosives have blast speeds of 20,000 ft/s (6,100 m/s) to 30,000 ft/s (9,100 m/s). As a result, they are capable of ejecting fragments at very high speeds of over 3,300 ft/s (1,000 m/s), implying very high energy (where the energy of a fragment is 1/2 mass × velocity^{2}, neglecting rotational energy). The military engineering data showed that, like the fragment size, the fragment velocities had characteristic distributions. It is possible to segment the fragment output from a warhead into velocity groups. For example, 95% of all fragments from a bomb blast under 4 grains (0.26 g) have a velocity of 3,000 ft/s (910 m/s) or less. This established a set of goals for military ballistic vest design.

The random nature of fragmentation required the military vest specification to trade off mass vs. ballistic-benefit. Hard vehicle armor is capable of stopping all fragments, but military personnel can only carry a limited amount of gear and equipment, so the weight of the vest is a limiting factor in vest fragment protection. The 2-4-16-64 grain series at limited velocity can be stopped by an all-textile vest of approximately 5.4 kg/m^{2} (1.1 lb/ft^{2}). In contrast to the design of vest for deformable lead bullets, fragments do not change shape; they are steel and can not be deformed by textile materials. The 2-grain (0.13 g) FSP (the smallest fragment projectile commonly used in testing) is about the size of a grain of rice; such small fast moving fragments can potentially slip through the vest, moving between yarns. As a result, fabrics optimized for fragment protection are tightly woven, although these fabrics are not as effective at stopping lead bullets.

== BR1 - BR7 (EN 1063, or CEN 1063) ==
EN 1063, or CEN 1063, is a security glazing standard created by the European Committee for Standardization for measuring the protective strength of bullet-resistant glass. It is commonly used in conjunction with EN 1522 (Euronorm standard for Bullet Resistance in Windows, Doors, Shutters and Blinds) to form a ballistic classification system by which armored vehicles and structures are tested and rated. A similar classification system primarily used in the United States is NIJ Standard 0108, the U.S. National Institute of Justice's Standard for Ballistic Resistant Protective Materials which includes glass and armor plate.

== Backing materials for testing ==
=== Ballistic ===
One of the critical requirements in soft ballistic testing is measurement of "back side signature" (i.e. energy delivered to tissue by a non-penetrating projectile) in a deformable backing material placed behind the targeted vest. The majority of military and law enforcement standards have settled on an oil/clay mixture for the backing material, known as Roma Plastilena. Although harder and less deformable than human tissue, Roma represents a "worst case" backing material when plastic deformations in the oil/clay are low (less than 20 mm (0.79 in)). (Armor placed over a harder surface is more easily penetrated.) The oil/clay mixture of "Roma" is roughly twice the density of human tissue and therefore does not match its specific gravity, however "Roma" is a plastic material that will not recover its shape elastically, which is important for accurately measuring potential trauma through back side signature.

The selection of test backing is significant because in flexible armor, the body tissue of a wearer plays an integral part in absorbing the high energy impact of ballistic and stab events. However the human torso has a very complex mechanical behavior. Away from the rib cage and spine, the soft tissue behavior is soft and compliant. In the tissue over the sternum bone region, the compliance of the torso is significantly lower. This complexity requires very elaborate bio-morphic backing material systems for accurate ballistic and stab armor testing. A number of materials have been used to simulate human tissue in addition to Roma. In all cases, these materials are placed behind the armor during test impacts and are designed to simulate various aspects of human tissue impact behavior.

One important factor in test backing for armor is its hardness. Armor is more easily penetrated in testing when backed by harder materials, and therefore harder materials, such as Roma clay, represent more conservative test methods.

Backer type	Materials	Elastic/plastic	Test type	Specific gravity	Relative hardness vs gelatin	Application
Roma Plastilina Clay #1	Oil/Clay mixture	Plastic	Ballistic and Stab	>2	Moderately hard	Back face signature measurement. Used for most standard testing
10% gelatin	Animal protein gel	Visco-elastic	Ballistic	~1 (90% water)	Softer than baseline	Good simulant for human tissue, hard to use, expensive. Required for FBI test methods
20% gelatin	Animal protein gel	Visco-elastic	Ballistic	~1 (80% water)	Baseline	Good simulant for skeletal muscle. Provides dynamic view of event.
HOSDB-NIJ Foam	Neoprene foam, EVA foam, sheet rubber	Elastic	Stab	~1	Slightly harder than gelatin	Moderate agreement with tissue, easy to use, low in cost. Used in stab testing
Silicone gel	Long chain silicone polymer	Visco-elastic	Biomedical	~1.2	Similar to gelatin	Biomedical testing for blunt force testing, very good tissue match
Pig or Sheep animal testing	Live tissue	Various	Research	~1	Real tissue is variable	Very complex, requires ethical review for approval

=== Stab ===
Stab and spike armor standards have been developed using 3 different backing materials. The Draft EU norm calls out Roma clay, The California DOC called out 60% ballistic gelatin and the current standard for NIJ and HOSDB calls out a multi-part foam and rubber backing material.

- Using Roma clay backing, only metallic stab solutions met the 109 joule Calif. DOC ice pick requirement
- Using 10% Gelatin backing, all fabric stab solutions were able to meet the 109 joule Calif. DOC ice pick requirement.
- Most recently the Draft ISO prEN ISO 14876 norm selected Roma as the backing for both ballistics and stab testing.

This history helps explain an important factor in Ballistics and Stab armor testing, backing stiffness affects armor penetration resistance. The energy dissipation of the armor-tissue system is Energy = Force × Displacement when testing on backings that are softer and more deformable the total impact energy is absorbed at lower force. When the force is reduced by a softer more compliant backing the armor is less likely to be penetrated. The use of harder Roma materials in the ISO draft norm makes this the most rigorous of the stab standards in use today.
