= Ballistic foam =

Foam used in the manufacture and repair of aircraft

Ballistic foam is a foam that sets hard. It is widely used in the manufacture and repair of aircraft to form a light but strong filler for aircraft wings. The foam is used to surround aircraft fuel tanks to reduce the chance of fires caused by the penetration of incendiary projectiles.

Ballistic foam is a type of polyurethane foam placed in the dry bays of aircraft. Ballistic foam prevents fires, adds strength to the structure, slows down the speed of shrapnel during attacks, and offers cost-effective protection.

Ballistic foam is placed in the dry bays to provide a barrier between the spark and the fuel. As bullets or shrapnel penetrate the mold line skin surrounding the outermost portions of the dry bay, the ballistic foam deprives sparks of oxygen. Thus when the article punctures the fuel tank, a fire is not started. Not only does the foam displace oxygen, but all gases, including explosive vapors which could magnify the destructive effects of ballistic attack. Dry bays, voids, may also contain “onboard ignition sources” like hot surfaces and electrical sparks which benefit both from a lack of gases and the fire-retardant nature of the foam.

Ballistic foam strengthens aircraft by protecting it from fire as well as fluid while adding very little weight. The protection from fluid involves resisting damage by “moisture, hydrocarbon fuels, hydraulic fluids, and most common solvents”. The density of the foam varies with the type being used; Type 2.5 is a white to light amber foam weighing 2.5 pounds per cubic foot, while Type 1.8 is a pale blue to green foam weighing 1.8 pounds per cubic foot.

Chopped fiberglass strands embedded in the foam add to the structural integrity through physical support and shrapnel mitigation. The layer that strengthens the foam in turn strengthens the airframe. The layer of fiberglass also prevents shrapnel and bullets from rupturing the foam. The fiber glass then allows the damage caused by projectile penetration to heal more effectively.

The passive protection afforded by ballistic foam is very simple and inexpensive compared to active protection. One method of active protection is done by filling large dry bays with inert gases which will not sustain a flame. This process is very expensive and complex. Active protection only offers a “one time” chance for ballistic protection while the ballistic foam is always available.

== See also ==
- Vaporific effect
