= Peter Bielkowicz =

Physicist

Peter Bielkowicz (1 February 1902 – 30 September 1993) was a physicist. He worked on designing the Apollo Lunar Module and many other projects. He developed and taught courses in many fields, including aerodynamics, flight mechanics, ballistics, mathematics, and astrodynamics. He created the Air Force Institute of Technology (AFIT)'s first courses in space mechanics and spaceflight.

He was a doctor of mathematics working in the Polish aircraft industry when Germany overran Poland. He evaded capture and made his way to France only to be overrun again by the Germans. He escaped to Spain by crossing the Pyrenees Mountains on foot and then walked through Spain. Just as he was about to step onto British soil at Gibraltar, the Spanish police arrested him. After two years in a Spanish prison, he was set free when the Allies of World War II defeated the Axis powers in Africa. He worked in the British aircraft industry for a few years after the war, and later was recruited by the United States while the United States space program was still in its infancy.

Professor Bielkowicz joined the faculty of the Air Force Institute of Technology School of Engineering in July 1953 as an assistant professor. He worked on designing the Apollo Lunar Module and many other projects including reusable spacecraft. He developed and taught courses in many fields, including aerodynamics, flight mechanics, ballistics, mathematics, and astrodynamics. He created AFIT's first courses in space mechanics and spaceflight. His astrodynamics courses were a central focus of the AFIT astronautics program introduced in 1958.

He also introduced orbital mechanics and familiarized his students with Moulton’s text on celestial mechanics. These classes taught missile trajectories and orbits. The missile ballistics class covered the ballistic flight solutions and various empirical solutions that had been developed.

== Publications ==
- P. Bielkowicz, R. C. Horrigan and R. C. Walsh. "Manual onboard methods of orbit determination", Journal of Spacecraft and Rockets, Vol. 8, No. 3 (1971), pp. 284–289. https://doi.org/10.2514/3.30261
- P. Bielkowicz. "Ground tracks of earth-period /24-hr/ satellites." AIAA Journal, Vol. 4, No. 12 (1966), pp. 2190–2195. https://doi.org/10.2514/3.3875
- P. Bielkowicz, A.F.R.Ae.S., (1947) "The Evolution of Energy in Jet and Rocket Propulsion", Aircraft Engineering and Aerospace Technology, Vol. 19 Issue: 1, pp.19-26, https://doi.org/10.1108/eb031459
