= Gaetano Marzagaglia =

Italian mathematician (1716-1787)

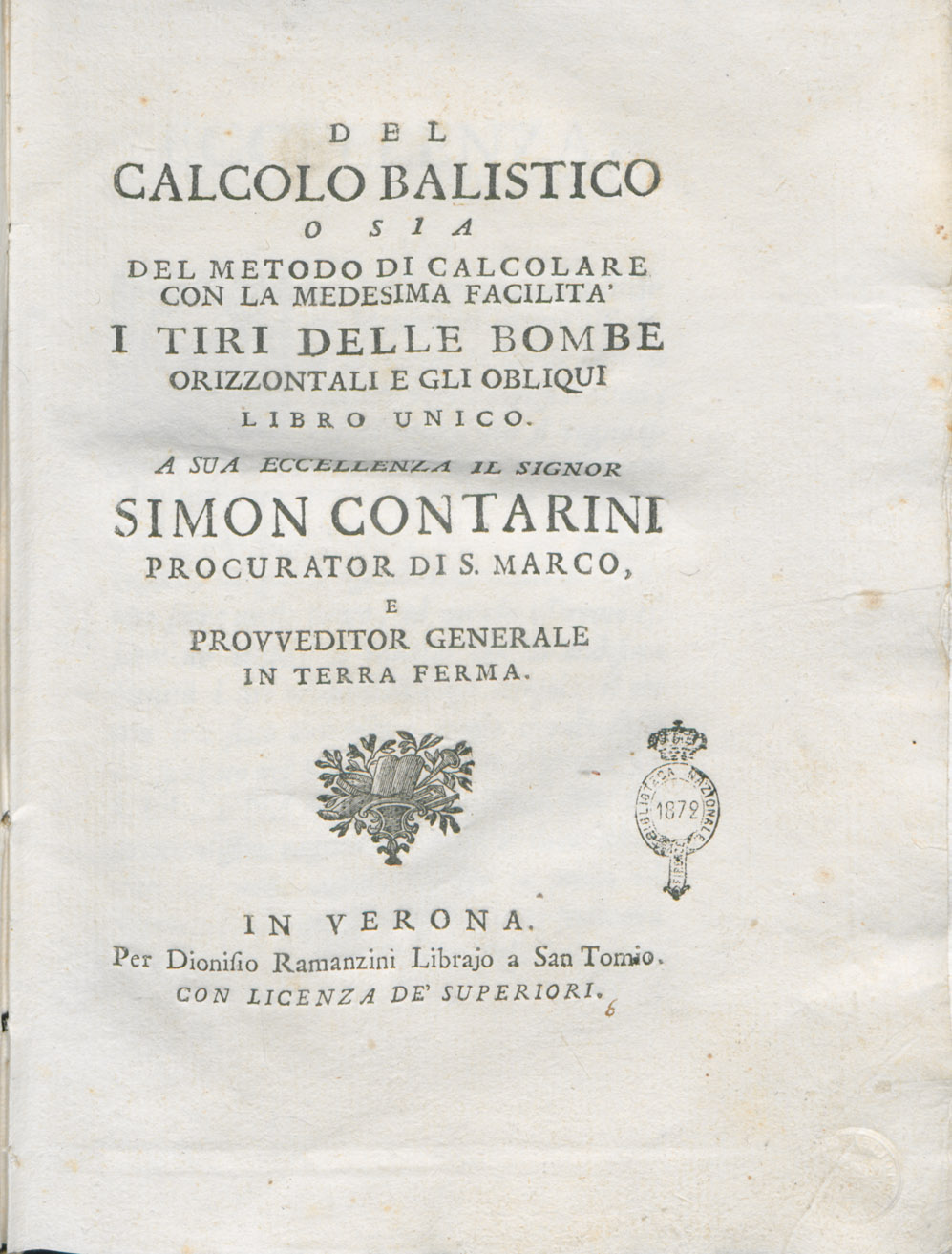
Del calcolo balistico (1748)

Gaetano Marzagaglia, or Marzagalia or Marcegaglia (Chiampo, 7 August 1716 – Verona, 1 July 1787), was an Italian mathematician and Catholic priest.

Marzagaglia was an advocate of the applications of mathematics and its importance in society. He directed the episcopal seminary of Verona from 1760 to 1772.

He refuted the theses of Giuseppe Suzzi in Lettera di un matematico italiano ("Letter of an Italian Mathematician"). In Dimostrazioni algebriche ("Algebraic Demonstrations"), he replied to a pamphlet by Francesco Ventretti.

== Works ==
- Nuova difesa dell'antica misura della forze motrici (in Italian). Verona: Dionigi Ramanzini. 1746.
- Del calcolo balistico (in Italian). Verona: Dionigi Ramanzini. 1748.
- Lettera di un matematico italiano intorno al libro del signor abbate Suzzi (in Italian). Verona: Dionigi Ramanzini. 1748.
- Fascetto di pratiche matematiche (in Italian). Verona: Dionigi Ramanzini. 1754.
