= Francesco Ventretti =

Italian mathematician (1713–1784)

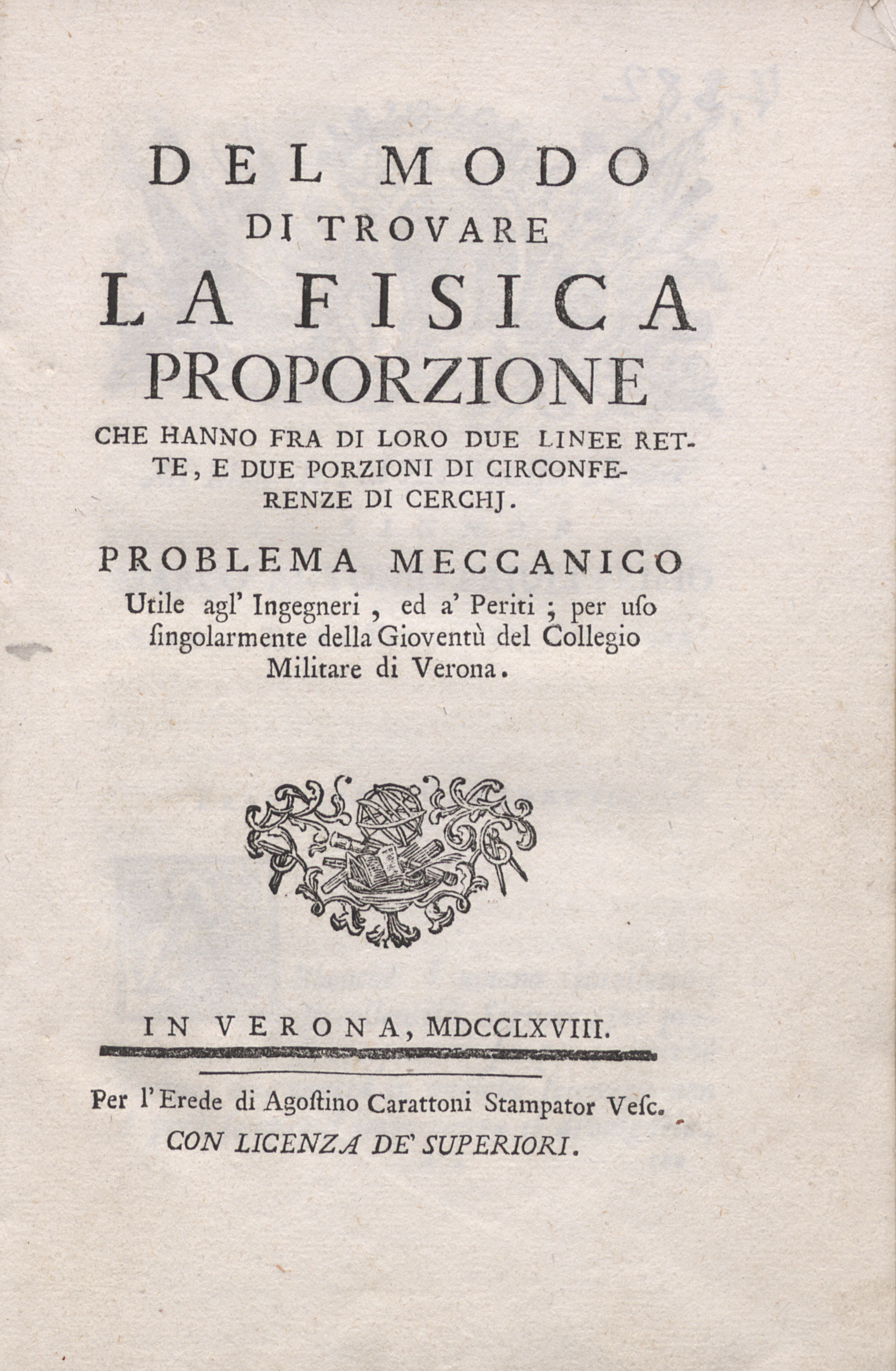
Del modo di trovare la fisica proporzione che hanno fra di loro due linee rette e due porzioni di circonferenze di cerchj, 1768

Francesco Ventretti (1713–1784) was an Italian mathematician.

== Life ==
Ventretti taught at the Military College of Verona and in 1773 invented the orosmeter, a tool to make precision measurements of hillside gradients.

Gaetano Marzagaglia commented on his works.

== Works ==
- Genesi di tutti li triangoli rettangoli numerici (in Italian). Verona: Antonio Andreoni. 1752.
- Del modo di trovare la fisica proporzione che hanno fra di loro due linee rette e due porzioni di circonferenze di cerchj (in Italian). Verona: erede di Agostino Carattoni. 1768.
- Dialoghi matematici (in Italian). Verona: Dionigi Ramanzini. 1789.
