= Vaporific effect =

The vaporific effect is a flash fire resulting from the impact of high-velocity projectiles with metallic objects. Impacts produce particulate matter originating from either the projectile, the target, or both. Particles heated from the force of impact can burn in the presence of air (oxidizer) or water vapor. An explosion can result from the mixture of metal-dust and air, the resulting dust explosion causing significant overpressure within metallic enclosures (aircraft, vehicles, metallic enclosures, etc.).

The vaporific effect is particularly pronounced when these enclosures are constructed of pyrophoric metals (metals that react upon contact with air, such as aluminium, magnesium, or their alloys). This effect is often referenced in movies, such as when a single bullet makes a helicopter explode.

== 1964 study ==
A November 1964 study by the United States Department of Defense aimed at studying this phenomenon and what causes it. The "Warhead Mechanisms Study" found that dense, white smoke as well as aluminum oxide and iron oxide were present with each vaporific effect. This was greatly diminished in a nitrogen atmosphere (compared to air), thus it was found that the "oxidation of metal fragments is a major factor."

== See also ==
- ballistics
- explosives
