= EN 1063 =

Security glazing standard

EN 1063, or CEN 1063, is a security glazing standard created by the European Committee for Standardization for measuring the protective strength of bullet-resistant glass. It is commonly used in conjunction with EN 1522 (Euronorm standard for Bullet Resistance in Windows, Doors, Shutters and Blinds) to form a ballistic classification system by which armored vehicles and structures are tested and rated. A similar classification system primarily used in the United States is NIJ Standard 0108, the U.S. National Institute of Justice's Standard for Ballistic Resistant Protective Materials which includes glass and armor plate.

== Threat Levels ==
The protective strength of a glazed shielding is rated based on the type of munitions, or threat level, it is capable of withstanding. There are 7 main standard threat levels: BR1-BR7 (also written as B1-B7), each corresponding to a different type of small arms fire. Additionally, there are two other threat levels (SG1 & SG2) corresponding to shotgun munitions.

To be given a particular rating, the glazing must stop the bullet for the specified number of strikes, with multiple strikes placed within 120mm of each other in the test sample which dimensions are 500±5mm x 500±5mm.

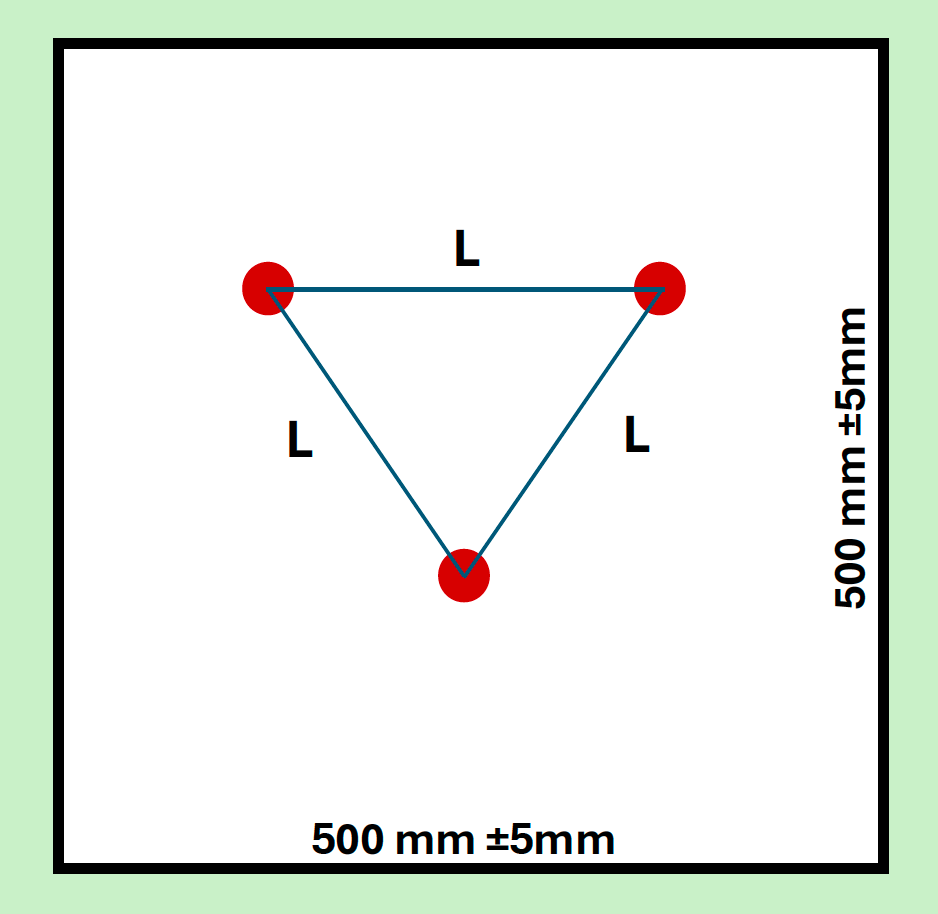
EN 1063 multi hit strike distance sample dimensions

The glazing should also be shatterproof and produce no spalls after each strike. Lastly, the classification levels are numbered in order of increasing protective strength. Thus any sample complying with the requirements of one class also complies with the requirements of previous classes. However, the SG (shotgun) classes do not necessarily comply with BR classes.

The precise test requirements and bullet types used are as follows:

Euronorm Standard For Security Glazing
Class	Weapon	Caliber	Type	Weight (g)	Range (m)	Velocity (m/s)	Impact Energy	Shots
BR1	Handgun/Rifle	.22 LR	LB/RN	2,6 ± 0,1	10,00 ± 0,5	360 ± 10	170 J	3
BR2	Handgun	9×19mm Parabellum	FJ/RN/SC	8,0 ± 0,1	5,00 ± 0,5	400 ± 10	640 J	3
BR3	Handgun	.357 Magnum	FJ/CB/SC	10,2 ± 0,1	5,00 ± 0,5	430 ± 10	940 J	3
BR4	Handgun	.44 Magnum	FJ/FN/SC	15,6 ± 0,1	5,00 ± 0,5	440 ± 10	1510 J	3
BR5	Rifle	5.56×45mm NATO	FJ/PB/SCP	4,0 ± 0,1	10,00 ± 0,5	950 ± 10	1800 J	3
BR6	Rifle	7.62×51mm NATO	FJ/PB/SC	9,5 ± 0,1	10,00 ± 0,5	830 ± 10	3270 J	3
BR7	Rifle	7.62×51mm NATO	FJ/PB/HC	9,8 ± 0,1	10,00 ± 0,5	820 ± 10	3290 J	3

_{LB} - Lead Bullet
_{FJ} - Full Metal Jacket
_{FN} - Flat Nose
_{RN} - Round Nose
_{CB} - Cone Bullet
_{PB} - Pointed Bullet
_{SC} - Soft Core (lead)
_{SCP} - Soft Core (lead) & Steel Penetrator
_{HC} - Hard core, steel hardness > 63 HRC
