= Ballistic limit =

Concept in physics

The ballistic limit or limit velocity is the velocity required for a particular projectile to reliably (at least 50% of the time) penetrate a particular piece of material. In other words, a given projectile will generally not pierce a given target when the projectile velocity is lower than the ballistic limit. The term ballistic limit is used specifically in the context of armor; limit velocity is used in other contexts.

The ballistic limit equation for laminates, as derived by Reid and Wen is as follows:

$V_b=\frac{\pi\,\Gamma\,\sqrt{\rho_t\,\sigma_e}\,D^2\,T}{4\,m} \left [1+\sqrt{1+\frac{8\,m}{\pi\,\Gamma^2\,\rho_t\,D^2\,T}}\, \right ]$
where

- $V_b\,$ is the ballistic limit
- $\Gamma\,$ is a projectile constant determined experimentally
- $\rho_t\,$ is the density of the laminate
- $\sigma_e\,$ is the static linear elastic compression limit
- $D\,$ is the diameter of the projectile
- $T\,$ is the thickness of the laminate
- $m\,$ is the mass of the projectile

Additionally, the ballistic limit for small-caliber into homogeneous armor by TM5-855-1 is:

$V_1= 19.72 \left [ \frac{7800 d^3 \left [ \left ( \frac{e_h}{d} \right) \sec \theta \right ]^{1.6}}{W_T} \right ]^{0.5}$
where

- $V_1$ is the ballistic limit velocity in fps
- $d$ is the caliber of the projectile, in inches
- $e_h$ is the thickness of the homogeneous armor (valid from BHN 360 - 440) in inches
- $\theta$ is the angle of obliquity
- $W_T$ is the weight of the projectile, in lbs
