= Adams =

Adams may refer to:

- Adams (surname)

== Places ==
=== United States ===
- Adams, California
- Adams, California, former name of Corte Madera, California
- Adams, Decatur County, Indiana
- Adams, Kentucky
- Adams, Massachusetts, a New England town
  - Adams (CDP), Massachusetts, the central village in the town
- Adams, Minnesota
- Adams, North Dakota
- Adams, Nebraska
- Adams, New Jersey
- Adams (town), New York
  - Adams (village), New York, within the town
- Adams, Oklahoma
- Adams, Oregon
- Adams, Pennsylvania, a former community in Armstrong County
- Adams, Tennessee
- Adams, Wisconsin, city in Adams County
- Adams, Adams County, Wisconsin, town
- Adams, Green County, Wisconsin, town
- Adams, Jackson County, Wisconsin, town
- Adams, Walworth County, Wisconsin, unincorporated community
- Adams Center, Wisconsin, a ghost town

=== Elsewhere ===
- Adams (lunar crater)
- Adams (Martian crater)
- Adams Island, New Zealand, one of the Auckland Islands
- Adams, Ilocos Norte, Philippines

== Transportation ==
=== Vehicles ===
- Adams (1903 automobile), an early 20th-century (1903–06) British automobile
- Adams (1905 automobile), an early 20th-century (1905–14) British automobile
- Adams-Farwell, an American automobile of the late 19th and early 20th-century (1889-1912)
- Adams (constructor), a former racing car constructor

=== Vessels ===
- Adams (brig), early 19th-century ship
- USS Adams, several ships

== Other uses ==
- MSC Adams, a multibody dynamics simulation software
- Adams (retailer), a children's clothes retailer
- Adam's ale, meaning water
- Adams Golf, a Texas-based golf club manufacturer
- Adams' Grammar School, Newport, Shropshire, England
- Adams House (disambiguation), a reference to any of several historic houses
- Adams Outdoor Advertising, an outdoor advertising company
- Adams Park, a football stadium in Buckinghamshire, England
- Adams Musical Instruments
- Anomaly Detection at Multiple Scales a project of the American military, designed to identify patterns and anomalies in very large data sets
- Beaumont–Adams revolver, a 19th-century firearm
- Cadbury Adams, confectionery company acquired by Cadbury from Pfizer in 2003
- ADAMS, short for Anti-Doping Administration and Management System, a database operated by the World Anti-Doping Agency (WADA)
- All Dulles Area Muslim Society, a mosque with many locations in Northern Virginia, United States
- The Adams, Indonesian indie rock band
- Adam's Chiclets, branding for Chiclets gum in parts of Latin America

== See also ==
- Adam (disambiguation)
- Adams County (disambiguation)
- Adams River (disambiguation)
- Adams Township (disambiguation)
- Mount Adams (disambiguation)
- Adams Peak (disambiguation)
- Justice Adams (disambiguation)
- Adamsburg, Pennsylvania
- Adamsdale (disambiguation)
- Adamstown (disambiguation)
- Adamsville (disambiguation)
- Addams
- Adams Pearmain
