= Adamsville =

Adamsville may refer to:

== Canada ==
- Adamsville, New Brunswick
- Adamsville, Ontario, a community
- Adamsville, Quebec

== United States ==
- Adamsville, Alabama
- Adamsville, Arizona, a former settlement
- Adamsville, California, a former settlement
- Adamsville, Delaware
- Adamsville (Atlanta), Georgia, a neighborhood
- Adamsville, Colrain, Massachusetts
- Adamsville, Hillsborough County, Florida
- Adamsville, Sumter County, Florida
- Adamsville, Kansas
- Salyersville, Kentucky, formerly known as Adamsville
- Adamsville, Michigan
- Adamsville, Ohio, a village in Muskingum County
- Adamsville, Gallia County, Ohio
- Adamsville, Pennsylvania
- Adamsville, Rhode Island
- Adamsville, Tennessee
- Adamsville, Texas
- Adamsville, Utah
- Adamsville, West Virginia
- Adamsville, Wisconsin
