= Webley Longspur =

Webley Longspur revolver
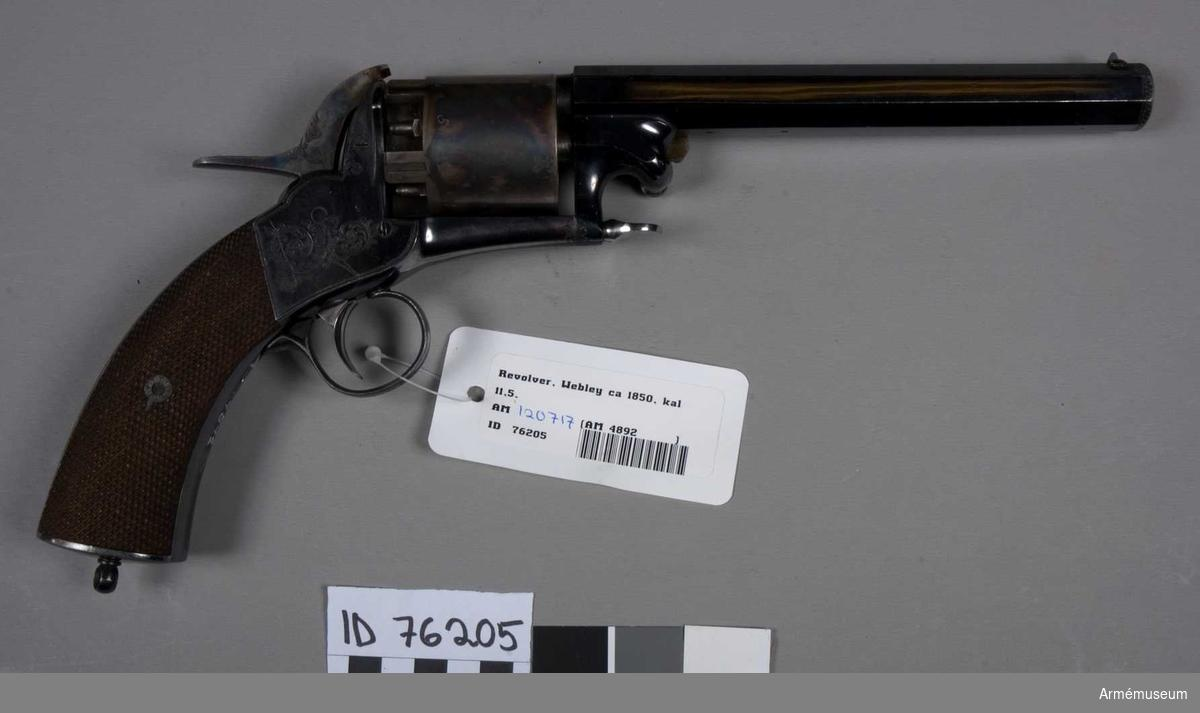
- A Webley Longspur cap and ball revolver, later model.
- Type: revolver
- Place of origin: United Kingdom

Service history
- In service: 1853–1867
- Used by: British Empire & Colonies, Bushrangers, Blackbirders
- Wars: Crimean War; Indian Rebellion of 1857; American Civil War; Fenian Raid

Production history
- Designer: Webley & Son
- Designed: 1853
- Manufacturer: Webley & Son
- Produced: 1853–1865
- No. built: approx. 2,000

Specifications
- Mass: 4.2 lb (1.9 kg), unloaded
- Calibre: .455 (11.6 mm)
- Action: Single or double action
- Rate of fire: 5 rounds/minute
- Effective firing range: 50 yd (46 m)
- Feed system: 5-round cylinder
- Sights: Fixed front blade and rear notch

Webley Longspur is an early British percussion revolver, patented in 1853. The first revolver of the later famous British factory Webley&Son, it was an open frame, 5-shot, single action revolver. It was a solid and popular weapon at the time, although it faced heavy competition from already established, popular Colt's and Adams revolvers.

== Background ==
The first commercially available percussion revolver was developed by Samuel Colt in 1834; serial production began in 1836 at his first factory in Paterson, New Jersey. Colt obtained patents for any firearm with a revolving cylinder in the US, UK and France in 1836. Colt thus had a monopoly on revolver production until 1857 in the US, and until 1851 in Europe. Although his first company went bankrupt in 1843, Colt's percussion revolvers gained popularity during Mexican-American War (1847–1848) and California gold rush (1849), which led to great demand for both large holster revolvers for cavalry and small pocket revolvers for self-defense.

Colt presented his revolvers at the 1851 Great Exhibition in London, and established his revolvers in the British market, opening his own factory in London in 1853; however, also in 1851 when Colt's British patent expired, British inventor Robert Adams patented his own, improved revolver design, self-cocking Adams revolver with double action trigger and solid frame, giving a faster rate of fire and greater durability than Colt's single action, open frame revolvers. The popularity of Adams' revolvers in the UK caused Colt to close his London factory in 1857.

At the time several other British gunsmiths had started production of their own percussion revolvers, competing with Colt and Adams on the British market. Among them were brothers James and Philip Webley, whose workshop in Birmingham was producing percussion rifles and pistols since 1835. Their first Webley Longspur cap-lock revolver was patented in 1853.

== Characteristics ==
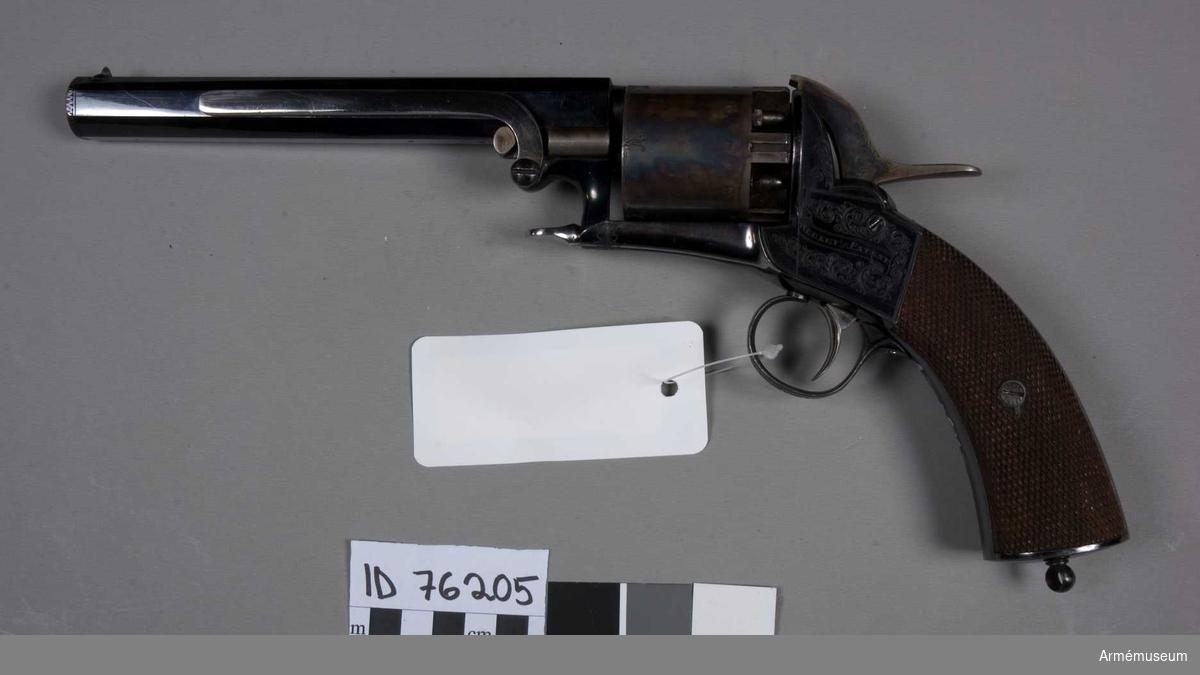
The same revolver from the left. In this model, the cylinder arbor was screwed into the front part of the frame, which was additionally attached to the rear part by a longitudinal screw under the cylinder (you can see it sticking out on the front lower corner of the frame). The loading lever of the Kerr type is mounted on the front frame and secured to side of the barrel.

=== Open frame ===
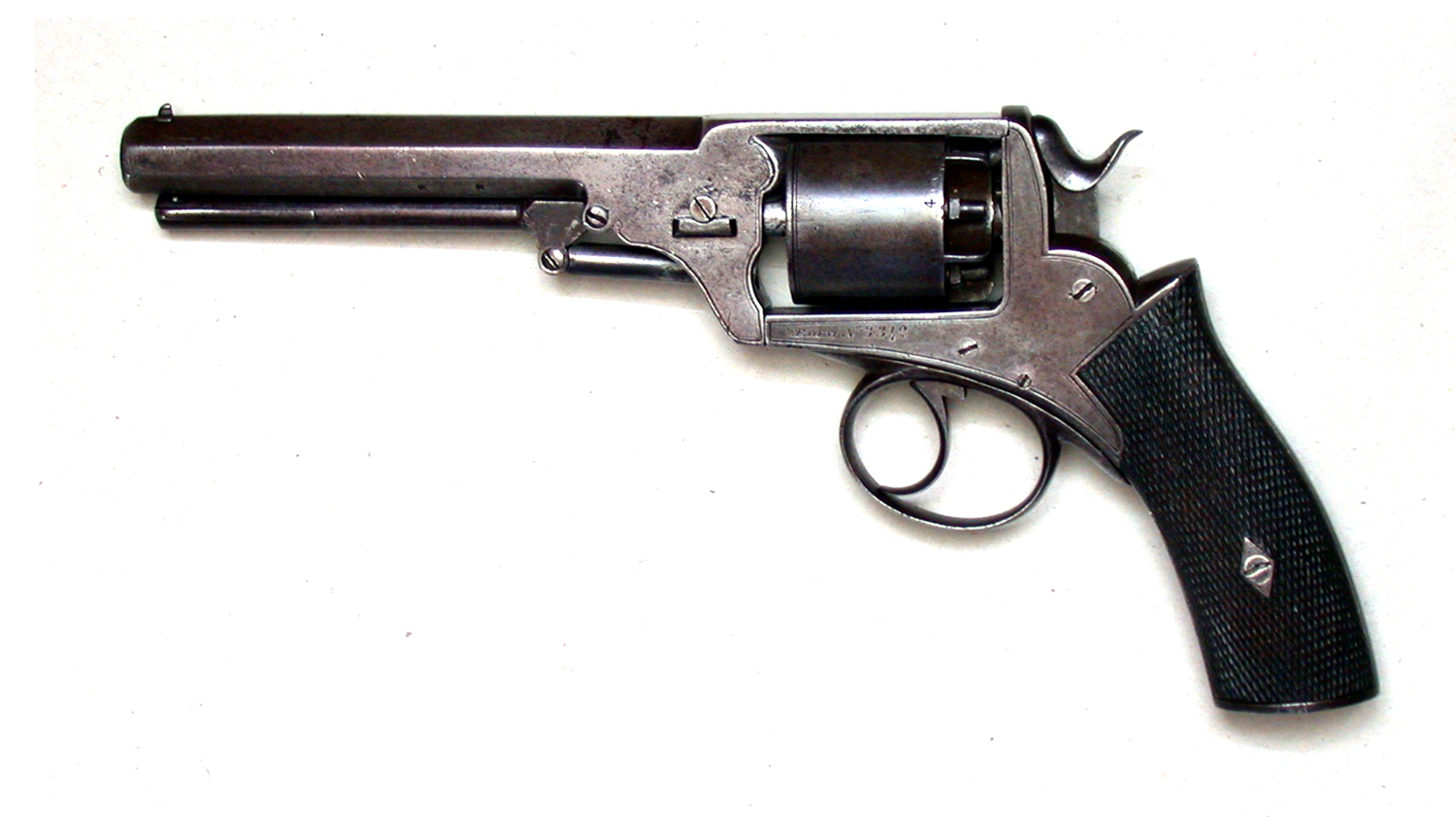
An 1857 Webley revolver, with a closed frame and a Colt-type rammer.

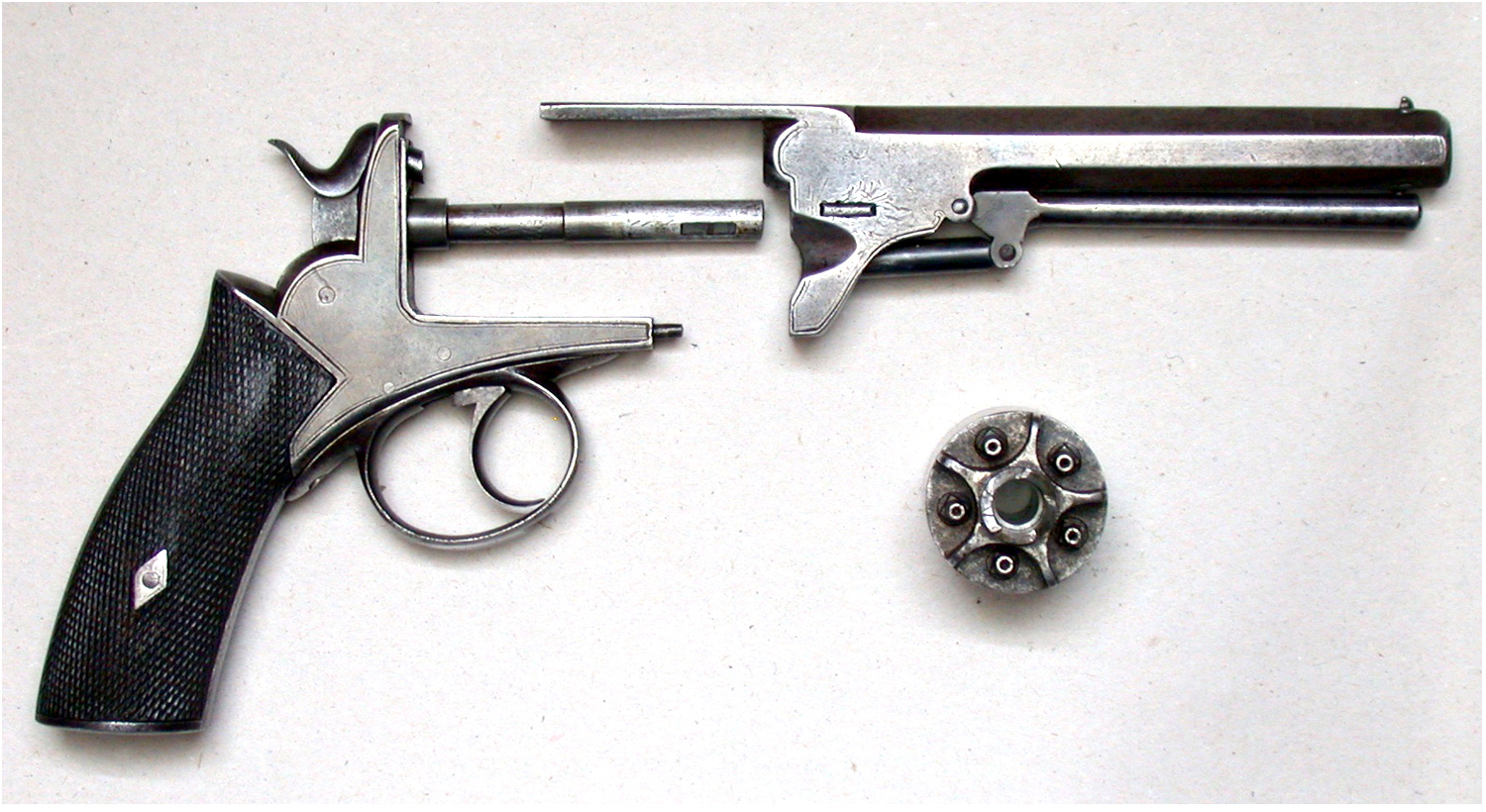
The same revolver, disasembled.

Unlike the Adams revolvers, which had dominated the British market since 1851, James Webley's revolvers mostly did not have a solid, one-piece frame and barrel, but instead had a two-piece body with an open frame, similar to the Colt 1851 Navy Revolver. In early Webley revolvers, the front part of the frame and the barrel formed a separate part, attached to the rear part of the frame via the cylinder arbor, which was an integral part of the breech. In the earliest models, the cylinder arbor was attached to the revolver barrel by a transverse flat vedge which passed through a hole in the front part under the barrel and on the arbor, in a way similar to Colt's revolvers. In later models, the front part was screwed on the cylinder arbor; the thread on the arbor screwed into a corresponding longitudinal hole drilled in the front part of the frame, under the barrel. In addition, the lower part of the front frame was connected to the rear frame under the cylinder by a longitudinal thumbscrew which could be screwed in or unscrewed manually without any tools. Some later Webleys had a closed frame strapped together at the top, giving them greater strength and durability than the Colts of the time.

=== Single action ===
Webley revolvers were made in both single-action and double-action form, although the early models were mainly single-action.

=== Loading lever ===
The earliest models of Webley revolver had a ramrod that was screwed perpendicularly into the handle of the gun. This was not a very practical option, so later models had an attached ramrod, with the two main types:

- Adams rammer, loading lever patented by Robert Adams, mounted on the right side of the frame with a screw on the front end and secured below the cylinder by the side of the butt. It was a straight lever pivoting around the perpendicular pin on its front end (fixed on the frame in front and below the cylinder) with a short, perpendicular ramrod in the middle which faced downwards in the fixed position. When in use, the lever had to be rotated manually down and forward for 270°, until the lever was in front of the cylinder and the ramrod entered one of the chambers, driving the ball in. This one was mostly fitted on the earlier models.
- Kerr rammer, loading lever patented by John Kerr, which was pivoted at the front of the frame and secured to the left side of the barrel. The lever had to be rotated upwards for 90° to drive the ramrod in the chamber.

=== Production ===
Although sturdy and reliable revolvers for their time, Webley Longspur faced heavy competition on the British market from the already established, popular brands of Colt Navy and Adams revolvers. In all, only about 2,000 of this early Webley revolvers were produced.

== Literature ==
- Kinard, Jeff (2003). Pistols, An Illustrated History of Their Impact. Santa Barbara, California: ABC-CLIO, Inc. ISBN 1-85109-475-X.
- Zhuk, A.B. (1995). Walter, John (ed.). The illustrated encyclopedia of HANDGUNS, pistols and revolvers of the world, 1870 to 1995. Translated by Bobrov, N.N. London: Greenhill Books. p. 16. ISBN 1-85367-187-8.
- Wilkinson, Frederick (1979). The Illustrated Book of Pistols. Optimum Books. p. 127. ISBN 0600372049.

== External sources ==
- TAB Short: Webley-Bentley Percussion Revolver
