= List of guns owned by historic figures =

Over the years, personal firearms owned by world leaders, outlaws, and legendary marksmen have become symbolic representations of their power and persona. These weapons can include finely engraved presentation pieces, and more rugged examples used by frontier legends.

== Pistols ==
Image	Type	Owner	Creator	Sources
	Gold-inlaid Walther PPK	Adolf Hitler	Carl Walther GmbH Sportwaffen	
	Flintlock dueling pistols	Andrew Jackson	Unknown	
	.22 caliber, Gold plated and engraved pistol	Annie Oakley	Stevens-Gould No. 37	
	M1911	Elvis Presley	Colt Manufacturing Company	
	FN Model 10	Gavrilo Princip	Fabrique Nationale	
	Golden Luger	Hermann Göring	Deutsche Waffen und Munitionsfabriken	
	Flintlock pistol	Lemuel Purnell Montgomery	Unknown	

== Revolvers ==
Image	Type	Owner	Creator	Sources
	Colt Third Model Dragoon Percussion Revolver	Abdul Mejid I	Colt Manufacturing Company	
	.38 Smith & Wesson revovler	Al Capone	Smith & Wesson	
	.44 British Bulldog revolver	Charles J. Guiteau	Webley & Scott	
	Colt Dragoon Revolvers	Emir Abdelkader	Colt Manufacturing Company	
	Colt Single-Action Army .45 and Smith & Wesson .357 Magnum revolvers	George S. Patton	Colt Manufacturing Company	
	Colt Dragoon Revolvers	George W. Morgan	Colt Manufacturing Company	
	Tranter revolver	J. E. B. Stuart	William Tranter	
	.45 Schofield Smith & Wesson Model 3 revovler	Jesse James	Smith & Wesson	
	.44 revovler	Jesse James	Hopkins & Allen	
	Colt Single Action Army	Judge Gerald	Colt Manufacturing Company	
	.32 Iver Johnson "Safety Automatic" revolver	Leon Czolgosz	Iver Johnson	
	Colt Third Model Dragoon Percussion Revolver	Nicholas I	Colt Manufacturing Company	
	Colt M1861 Navy Revolvers	Philip H. Sheridan	Colt Manufacturing Company	
	Colt Navy Revolver	Wild Bill Hickok	Colt Manufacturing Company	
	Smith & Wesson Model 3 revovler	Wyatt Earp	Smith & Wesson	
	Smith & Wesson Model 3 revovler	Wyatt Earp	Smith & Wesson	

== Rifles ==
Image	Type	Owner	Creator	Sources
	Henry repeating rifle	Abraham Lincoln	New Haven Arms Company	
	Remington Gamemaster Model 760	James Earl Ray	Remington Arms	
	Winchester lever-action rifle	Jesse James	Winchester Repeating Arms Company	
	Sharps rifle	John Brown	Sharps Rifle Manufacturing Company	
	Scoped Carcano rifle	Lee Harvey Oswald	Brescia Arms Factory	
	Hunting musket	Napoleon Bonaparte	Jean Lepage	
	Harmonica rifle	Sam Houston	Henry Gross	
	Miquelet jezai	Thomas Jefferson	Muhammad the gunsmith	
	Miquelet lock musket	Thomas Jefferson	Ammal Barah	
	Percussion sports rifle	Ulysses S. Grant	N. & N. Gilbert Whitmore	
	Percussion rifle	William J. Graves	Henry Deringer	

== Shotguns ==
Image	Type	Owner	Creator	Sources
	12 gauge double-barreled shotgun	James W. Jackson	Unknown	
	12 gauge double-barreled shotgun	Theodore Roosevelt	Ansley H. Fox	
