= Adamston =

Adamston may refer to:

- Adamston, West Virginia, a former town in Harrison County
- Adamston, New Jersey, an unincorporated community within Brick Township
- Victory High School (currently known as Adamston High School), located in Clarksburg, West Virginia

== See also ==
- Adamstown (disambiguation)
