= Sripada =

Sripada or Sri Pada, also spelled Shripada or Sreepada, may refer to:

== People ==
- Sripada Sri Vallabha, an Indian Hindu religious leader who lived in Pithapuram, Andhra Pradesh, India, believed to be an incarnation of Dattatreya
- Sripadaraja, an Indian Hindu saint, philosopher, believed to be an incarnation of Dhruva
- Sripada Kameswara Rao, Indian writer and translator
- Sripada Krishnamurty Sastry, Indian writer
- Sripada Pinakapani, Indian musician
- Sripada Subrahmanya Sastry, Indian writer
- T. K. Sreepada Rao, is a nephrologist of Indian origin

== Other ==
- Adam's Peak, also known as Sri Pada, a tall conical mountain located in central Sri Lanka
  - Sripada forest skink, a species of lizard
- Sripada Yellampalli project, irrigation project in India

== See also ==
- Shripad, alternative form of the Indian male given name
- Adams Peak (disambiguation)
