= William Tranter =

British gunmaker

- Born: William Tranter; June 6, 1816; Oldbury, Worcestershire, United Kingdom
- Died: January 7, 1890 (aged 73); Birmingham, England
- Occupations: Inventor, gunsmith

William Tranter (1816 – January 7, 1890) was a British gunmaker and gun designer famous for inventing the Tranter revolver.

== His youth and early career ==
Born in Oldbury in Worcestershire, William Tranter was the eldest son of a blacksmith. Birmingham was for many years the centre of arms manufacture in England and in 1830, at the age of 14, Tranter was apprenticed to the gunsmithing firm of Hollis Bros & Company. In 1839 a small legacy allowed him to buy out another Birmingham gunsmith.

Tranter went into partnership with his former employers, John and Isaac Hollis, in 1844. The partnership dissolved five years later, and Tranter is known to have had an extensive manufactory, together with sales offices, at 50 Loveday Street between 1854 and 1860.

== Modifications and alterations on revolvers ==
By about the year 1853 Tranter had manufactured over 8000 Adams double-action revolvers under licence. Together with James Kerr, Tranter developed modifications to the Adams action and about 1853 he made the first of his double trigger, double-action revolvers. The first model was built on an Adams frame and featured a detachable rammer which fitted onto the frame. His next model featured a rammer secured by a keyed peg on the frame and a hook on the barrel. In 1855 he also manufactured his own version of the Beaumont–Adams revolver, known as the Tranter-Adams-Kerr.

After 1856 he began production of his third model double trigger revolver, with a more streamlined frame and screw-secured rammer. At the same time he developed his fourth model, a single trigger, double-action revolver based on the same frame.

At the time the size of revolvers was typically described by the bore instead of the term calibre which is used today. The bore size equates to the number of lead balls of a particular diameter that can be cast from one pound (454 g) of lead. Tranter's most common bores were:

Bore	Calibre (in)	Calibre (mm)
120	0.320	9.13
80	0.380	9.65
54	0.442	11.2
38	0.500	12.7
24	0.577	14.7

== The use of his guns in the U.S. ==
With the onset of the American Civil War, the Confederate States began buying British arms in quantity and Tranter's high-quality weapons were much esteemed. The New Orleans importers Messrs Hyde & Goodrich and A. B. Griswold & Co (who later manufactured his own pistols) distributed Tranters. Tranter also produced percussion rifles that used a revolver cylinder instead of a magazine. These rifles were produced in various configurations including both single and double trigger mechanisms.

Two Tranters were carried by the famous detective Allan Pinkerton, whose detective agency protected U.S. officials prior to the creation of the U.S. Secret Service. He is said to have armed his men with Tranter double trigger revolvers. An engraved and nickel-plated Tranter model 1879, marked "Made for W.A. Pinkerton by Thos M. Tranter. 16 Weaman St., Birmingham" is thought to have been presented to William A. Pinkerton, one of Allan's sons.

== His increasing success ==
Tranter continued to produce percussion revolvers well after the introduction of cartridge revolvers since many shooters were more comfortable with the old system, which was also cheaper. However, in 1863 Tranter secured patents for revolvers using the rimfire system, some of the first in Britain. Tranter's rim-fire revolvers ranged from small caliber single- and double-action revolvers to the large solid frame model 1863 revolver in .442 in (11.2 mm) caliber. Tranter began manufacturing center fire revolvers in 1868.

In late 1867 Tranter constructed a new, larger facility on Lichfield Road in Aston Cross, called "The Tranter Gun and Pistol Factory", although business continued to be conducted at the old location for some time. At that time Tranter's was the most extensive pistol-making business in the Midlands. Tranter produced over 20 different pistols of his own design, together with other designers' guns under contract. He had government contracts for the official British Snider Rifle, and in 1878 was granted a government contract for a solid frame .450 centre fire revolver for use by the British army. He supplied weapons of every kind to the gun trade in general, including overseas markets.

Between 1849 and 1888 Tranter made 24 patent applications. Nineteen of those were for cartridge weapons including bolt-action rifles and machine guns, as well as his famous revolvers. "Tranter was certainly in the very forefront of rook rifle development and production."

Tranter was a substantial property owner and a founding member of the Birmingham Small Arms Company Ltd., of which he was a director in its early years. As a prominent member of the Birmingham small arms trade he was called as a witness before a parliamentary committee on small arms in 1854.

== The end of his life, and his legacy ==
Tranter retired in 1885 and died on January 7, 1890. His factory was leased by his friend George Kynoch and was renamed The Kynoch Gun Factory. In 1888 the name was changed to the Aston Arms Factory, which had ceased by 1900 when the factory was occupied by the Clipper Automatic Tyre Co. The factory was ultimately demolished in 1961.

William Tranter's own son, William Grosvener Tranter, registered at least two firearms patents but appears to have been only slightly interested in the gun industry. However William's son-in-law, Thomas William Watson, was joined his by brother in 1884 to form the arms company of Watson Brothers. William's nephews, Walter Tranter and Alfred William Thompson and Thomas Musgrove Tranter formed an arms firm called Tranter Bros. Gunmakers in Birmingham in 1900. The firm, which also sold bicycles in the 1890s, closed in 1957.

== See also ==
- Revolver
- Handgun
- Pistol
- Antique guns
