= Mount Adam =

Mount Adam may refer to:

- Mount Adam, Sri Lanka
- Mount Adam (Antarctica)
- Mount Adam (British Columbia)
- Mount Adam (Falkland Islands)

== See also ==
- Mount Adams (disambiguation)
