= Judge Adams =

Judge Adams may refer to:

- Annette Abbott Adams (1877–1956), judge of the California Court of Appeal
- Arlin Adams (1921–2015), judge of the United States Court of Appeals for the Third Circuit
- Elmer B. Adams (1842–1916), judge of the United States Court of Appeals for the Eighth Circuit
- George Adams (Mississippi judge) (1784–1844), judge of the United States District Courts for the District of Mississippi and for the Northern and Southern Districts of Mississippi
- George B. Adams (1845–1911), judge of the United States District Court for the Southern District of New York
- Henry Lee Adams Jr. (born 1945), judge of the United States District Court for the Middle District of Florida
- Jed C. Adams (1876–1935), judge of the United States Board of Tax Appeals
- John J. Adams (1860–1926), judge of the Fifth Circuit Court of Ohio
- John R. Adams (born 1955), judge of the United States District Court for the Northern District of Ohio
- Robert Patten Adams (1831–1911), puisne judge in Tasmania

== See also ==
- Justice Adams (disambiguation)
