= Adamstown =

Adamstown may refer to:

== Locations ==
=== Australia ===
- Adamstown, New South Wales, a suburb in New South Wales

=== Ireland ===
- Adamstown, Castletownkindalen, a townland in Castletownkindalen civil parish, barony of Moycashel, County Westmeath
- Adamstown, Conry, a townland in Conry civil parish, barony of Rathconrath, County Westmeath
- Adamstown, a townland in County Louth
- Adamstown, a townland in County Meath
- Adamstown, County Wexford, a village in County Wexford
- Adamstown, Dublin, a suburb of Dublin

=== Pitcairn Island ===
- Adamstown, Pitcairn Islands, the capital and only city of the Pitcairn Islands

=== United States ===
- Adamstown, alternate name for Neals Diggins, California
- Adamstown, Maryland, a town in Frederick County, Maryland
- Adamstown, Pennsylvania, a borough in Lancaster County, Pennsylvania

== Transportation ==
- Adamstown railway station, New South Wales, in Adamstown, New South Wales, Australia
- Adamstown railway station (Ireland), in Adamstown, Dublin, Ireland

== See also ==
- Adamston (disambiguation)
