= Adams River =

Adams River may refer to:

- Adams River (British Columbia), Canada, a river in south-central British Columbia
- Adams River (New Zealand)
- Adams River (Tasmania), Australia, a tributary of Gordon River

== See also ==
- Adams (disambiguation)
