= Tranter (revolver) =

Tranter Revolver
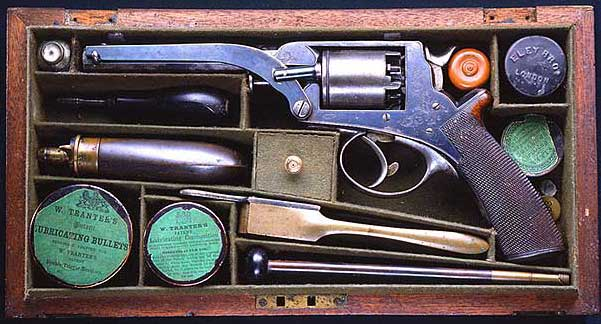
- Tranter revolver (Second Model with single trigger) in .44 Army, from the collection of General JEB Stuart
- Type: Revolver
- Place of origin: United Kingdom

Service history
- In service: 1855–1878
- Used by: United Kingdom & Colonies, Confederate States, United States, Australia, Canada
- Wars: American Civil War, Anglo-Zulu War, Fenian raids, Red River Rebellion

Production history
- Designer: William Tranter & Robert Adams
- Designed: 1853
- Manufacturer: Tranter
- Produced: c.1854-c.1880
- No. built: approx

Specifications
- Mass: approx 2.4lb (1.1 kg), unloaded
- Cartridge: .230 Tranter Rimfire, .297 Tranter Rimfire, .320 Tranter Rimfire, .380 Tranter Rimfire, .442 Tranter Rimfire; .320 Tranter Centrefire, .380 Tranter Centrefire, .442 Tranter Short Centrefire, .450 Adams, .500 Tranter Centrefire, .577 Tranter Centerfire Revolver. (conversions & variants)
- Calibre: Percussion: 120-bore (.32-calibre), .36-caliber Navy (.374-calibre), 80-bore (.387-calibre), 54-bore (.442-calibre), .44-caliber Army (.451-calibre), 38-bore (.500-calibre), & 24-bore (.577-calibre).
- Action: Double-action
- Muzzle velocity: 620ft/s (190m/s)
- Effective firing range: 35yds
- Maximum firing range: 100yds
- Feed system: 5 or 6-round cylinder
- Sights: Fixed front post and rear notch

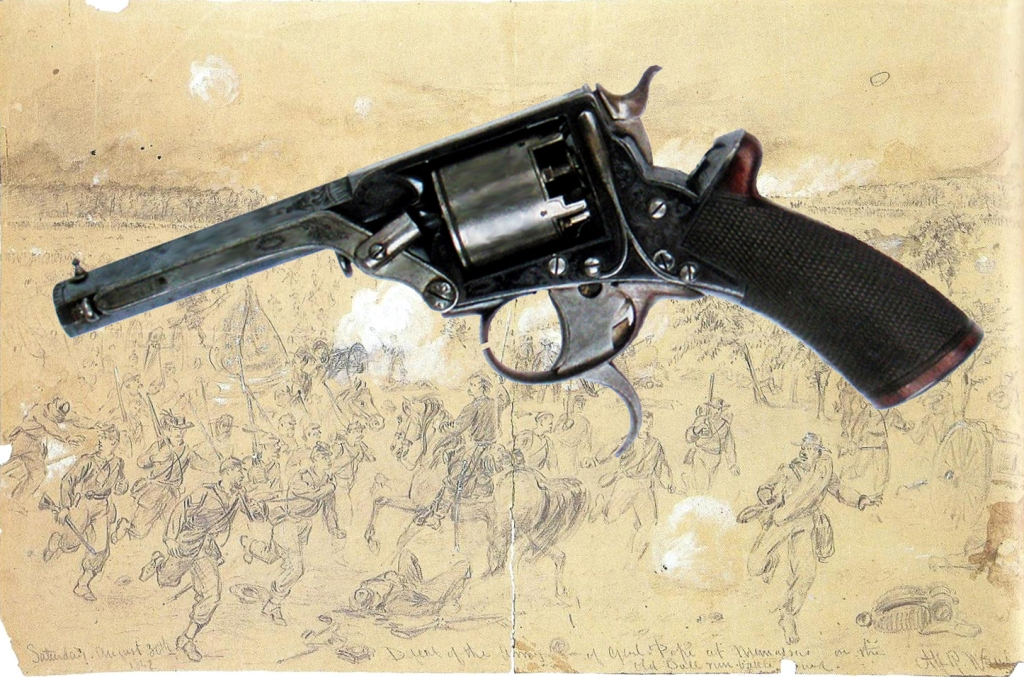
Tranter revolver, first model, dual-trigger

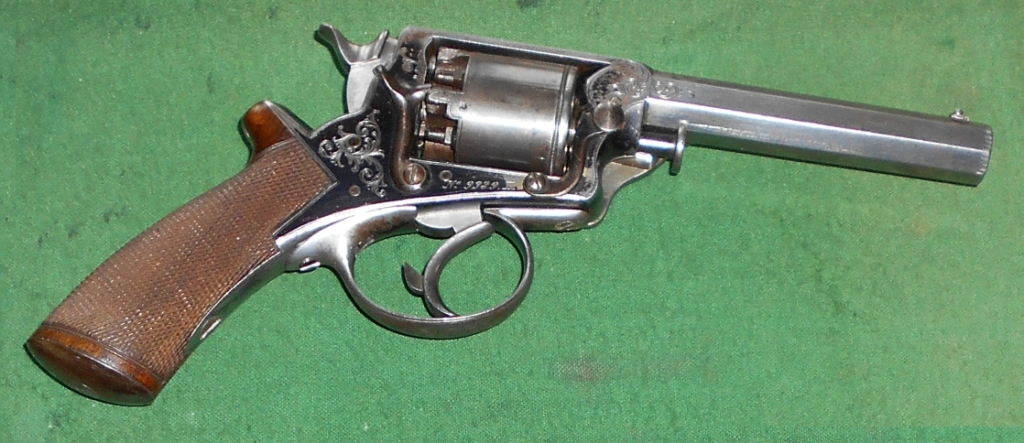
Tranter Revolver 2nd Model

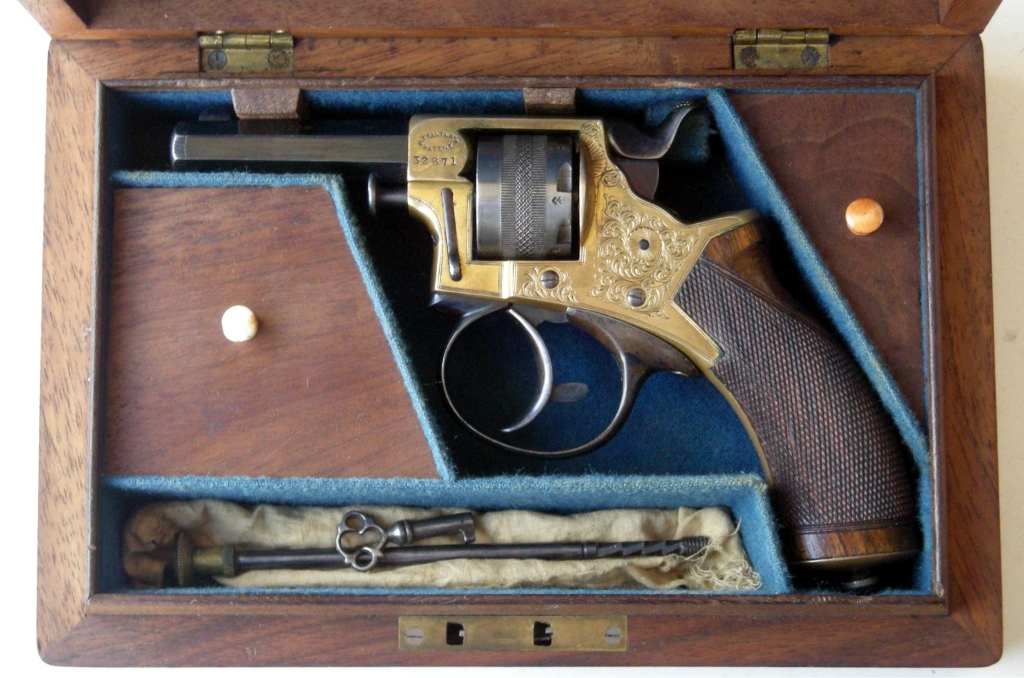
Tranter .230 Revolver

The Tranter revolver was a double-action cap & ball revolver invented around 1856 by English firearms designer William Tranter (1816–1890). Originally operated with a special dual-trigger mechanism (one to rotate the cylinder and cock the gun, a second to fire it) later models employed a single-trigger mechanism much the same as that found in the contemporary Beaumont–Adams revolver.

Early Tranter revolvers were generally versions of the various Robert Adams-designed revolver models, of which Tranter had produced in excess of 8000 revolvers by 1853. The first model of his own design used the frame of an Adams-type revolver, with a modification in the mechanism which he had jointly developed with James Kerr. The first model was sold under the name Tranter-Adams-Kerr.

== Design and operation ==
The Tranter revolver was a "solid-frame" design, very similar in appearance to the Beaumont–Adams revolver. Over the course of the 3 models Tranter developed, the only significant change was to the attachment of the ramrod- In the first model it was detachable, on the second model it was attached to the frame by a hook on the fixed barrel, and in the third model (1856) it was attached to the barrel by a screw.

On the double-trigger Tranter revolvers, a second trigger below the trigger guard served to cock the gun. The hammer on this model had no spur and therefore could not be cocked with the thumb. To fire the weapon in the single-action mode, one had to first press the lower trigger, which would pull the hammer back and rotate the cylinder; at this point one could fire the gun with a light pull on the upper trigger. To fire more rapidly, one could pull both triggers simultaneously, making it a double-action weapon.

== History ==
With the beginning of the American Civil War, the demands for foreign weapons in the Confederate States of America increased, as the Confederacy no longer had access to the weapons factories in the North and had almost no local small-arms manufacturing capability of their own. At the outbreak of the war, Tranter had a contract with the importing firm Hyde & Goodrich in New Orleans to import and distribute his revolvers commercially. Following the outbreak of the Civil War, Hyde and Goodrich dissolved their partnership, and its successors, Thomas, Griswold & Company, and A. B. Griswold & Company, continued to distribute Tranter's guns.

As a reliable, functional, and proven design, Tranter revolvers soon enjoyed a great popularity among the Confederate military. The Tranter was originally produced in six calibres, with .36, .442, and .50 being the most popular, while Tranter developed an Army model (.44 calibre) and a Navy model (.36 calibre) for the American market.

After the American Civil War, production continued of the Tranter percussion revolver (despite the increasing availability of cartridge-firing designs), because many people thought percussion firearms were safer and cheaper than the "new-fangled" cartridge-based designs of the time. In 1863, Tranter secured the patent for rimfire cartridges in England, and started production using the same frame as his existing models. As early as 1868, Tranter had also begun the manufacture of centrefire cartridge revolvers.

By 1867, his company expanded its production with a new factory in Aston Cross, Birmingham, West Midlands under the name "The Tranter Gun and Pistol Factory". In 1878, he received a contract from the British Army for the supply of .450-calibre centrefire cartridge revolvers for use in the Zulu War. This was the last official use of Tranter revolvers by the British military. Tranter retired in 1885, with his patent rights (between 1849 and 1888 Tranter secured 24 patents firearms design patents and 19 cartridge patents) as well as the Tranter factory later being acquired by munitions manufacturer George Kynoch.

=== Kynoch Gun Works ===
Kynoch renamed the factory "The Kynoch Gun Works" in 1885 and changed the address on its packaging from Birmingham to the more posh Aston. The factory's manager, Henry Schlund, held a patent in his own name for a revolver that was similar to the double-action six-cylinder Tranter revolver. The revolver had a one-piece curved wooden grip, a shrouded hammer, a top-break cylinder with star-ejector, and a double trigger. (The first trigger, lying below the trigger guard and pulled with the middle finger, cocked the hammer and advanced the cylinder while the second trigger, which lay inside the trigger guard and was pulled by the index finger, tripped the sear). Schlund patented and produced an improved version in 1886 that had the cocking trigger inside the trigger guard.

The Kynoch Model 1 was a large-framed revolver with a 6-inch barrel that came in .430 Tranter Short Centrefire, .450 Adams, .455/.476 Enfield Mk II, and .476 Enfield Mk II. It was designed for sale to Army officers. Some came with a detachable steel wire stock to convert it into a pistol carbine. The Kynoch Model 2 was a medium-framed revolver with a 5-inch barrel that came in .320 Tranter Centrefire Revolver, .360 Tranter Centrefire Revolver, .380 Tranter Centrefire Revolver, and .400 Tranter Centrefire. It was designed as a self-defense pistol. The Kynoch Model 3 was a small-framed revolver with a 3-inch barrel that came in .297/300 Tranter Centrefire and .300 Tranter Centrefire. It was designed as a "Saloon" pistol for indoors target practice or a "Rook and Rabbit" pistol for hunting vermin or small game.

The boardmembers of Kynoch's company rebelled at his lack of focus and Kynoch was removed as chairman in 1888. The Gun Works was then sold to Schlund, who renamed the company Aston Arms Co. Ltd. and the brand name to the Schlund Revolver. The factory closed down in 1891. Only 600 Kynock revolvers of all versions and models were ever made.

=== Notable users ===
Famous users of Tranter revolvers included Allan Pinkerton, founder of the infamous Pinkertons in North America; the North-West Mounted Police of Canada; the Confederate General J. E. B. Stuart' European adventurers in colonial Africa, such as Paul Du Chaillu and Henry Morton Stanley; Ben Hall of Colony of New South Wales and other outlaw bushrangers of colonial Australia; and Arthur Conan Doyle's Sherlock Holmes. Richard Jordan Gatling, inventor of the gatling gun, owned an 80-bore (.38-calibre) First Model Tranter Pocket Revolver with a 4.29-inch [109mm] barrel, which was retailed by the gunmakers Cogswell London (now Cogswell and Harrison) in 1857.

=== Popular culture ===
A Tranter revolver was used by Lord John Clayton (played by Paul Geoffrey) in the 1984 feature film Greystoke: The Legend Of Tarzan.

In the 1971 western Hannie Caulder, the lead character (played by Raquel Welch) carries the first model (dual-trigger version) of the Tranter. In the movie, however, the revolver is custom made from scratch for her by a gunsmith.

The 1856 Tranter Revolver and the 1856 Tranter Revolving Rifle feature prominently in the 2016 Australian film The Legend of Ben Hall, as both weapons were historically favoured by bushrangers Ben Hall and John Gilbert.

In the series of novels that bear his name, Harry Flashman often mentions carrying and using Tranter revolvers.
