= Mount Quincy Adams =

Mount Quincy Adams, named after John Quincy Adams (1767–1848), the sixth President of the United States, can refer to:

- Mount Quincy Adams, a subsidiary peak of Mount Adams (New Hampshire), New Hampshire, U.S.
- Mount Quincy Adams (Fairweather Range), on the Canada/Alaska, U.S. border

== See also ==
- Mount Adams (disambiguation)
- Mount Quincy
