= Shripad =

Shripad may refer to:

- Shripad Dabholkar (1924–2001), intellectual and activist from India
- Shripad Krushna Kolhatkar (1871–1934), Marathi writer
- Shripad Mahadev Mate (1886–1957), (or Shri Maa MaaTe), a Marathi writer
- Shripad Narayan Pendse (1913–2007), major Indian novelist of the post-Independence period
- Shripad Shri Vallabha the first avatara (incarnation) of the deity Shri Dattatreya in Kali Yuga
- Shripad Yasso Naik (born 1952), member of the 14th Lok Sabha of India
