= Adamsville, West Virginia =

Unincorporated community in West Virginia, United States

- Unincorporated community
- Location within West Virginia Location within the United States
- Coordinates: 39°23′43″N 80°14′40″W
- Country: United States
- State: West Virginia
- County: Harrison
- Elevation: 1,053 ft (321 m)
- Time zone: UTC-5 (Eastern (EST))
  - Summer (DST): UTC-4 (EDT)
- GNIS feature ID: 1534808

Adamsville is an unincorporated community in Harrison County, West Virginia, United States. Its post office is closed.
