= Adams (revolver) =

Adams revolver
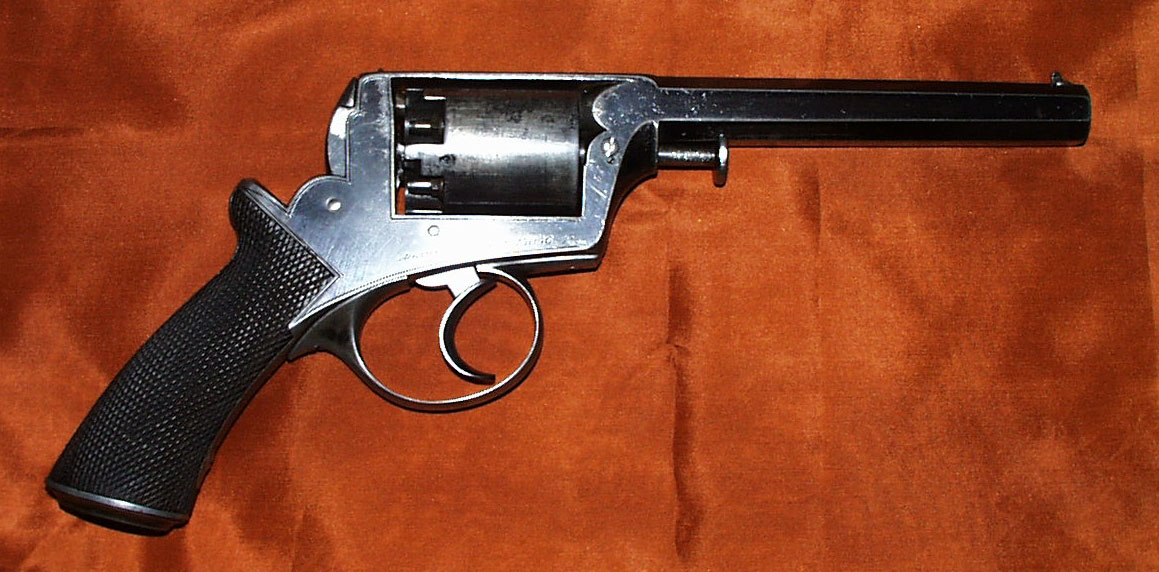
- Adams percussion revolver
- Type: Revolver
- Place of origin: United Kingdom

Service history
- In service: 1851–1868 (percussion); 1868–1880 (breechloader)
- Used by: United Kingdom & Colonies; Confederate States
- Wars: Crimean War; Indian Rebellion of 1857; American Civil War; Anglo-Zulu War

Production history
- Designer: Robert Adams
- Designed: 1851
- Manufacturer: Deane, Adams&Deane; Robert Adams of London

Specifications
- Mass: 30 oz (0.85 kg), unloaded
- Length: 11.5 in. (292 mm)
- Barrel length: 6.5 in. (165 mm)
- Cartridge: .450 Adams Boxer centerfire cartridge (conversion & variants)
- Calibre: .440 in (11.2 mm), .500 in (12.7 mm), .320 in (8.1 mm)
- Action: Double-action
- Muzzle velocity: c550 ft/s (168 m/s)
- Effective firing range: 35 yd (32 m)
- Maximum firing range: 100 yd (91 m)
- Feed system: 5-round cylinder (percussion); 5-6 shot cylinder (breechloader)
- Sights: Fixed front post and rear notch

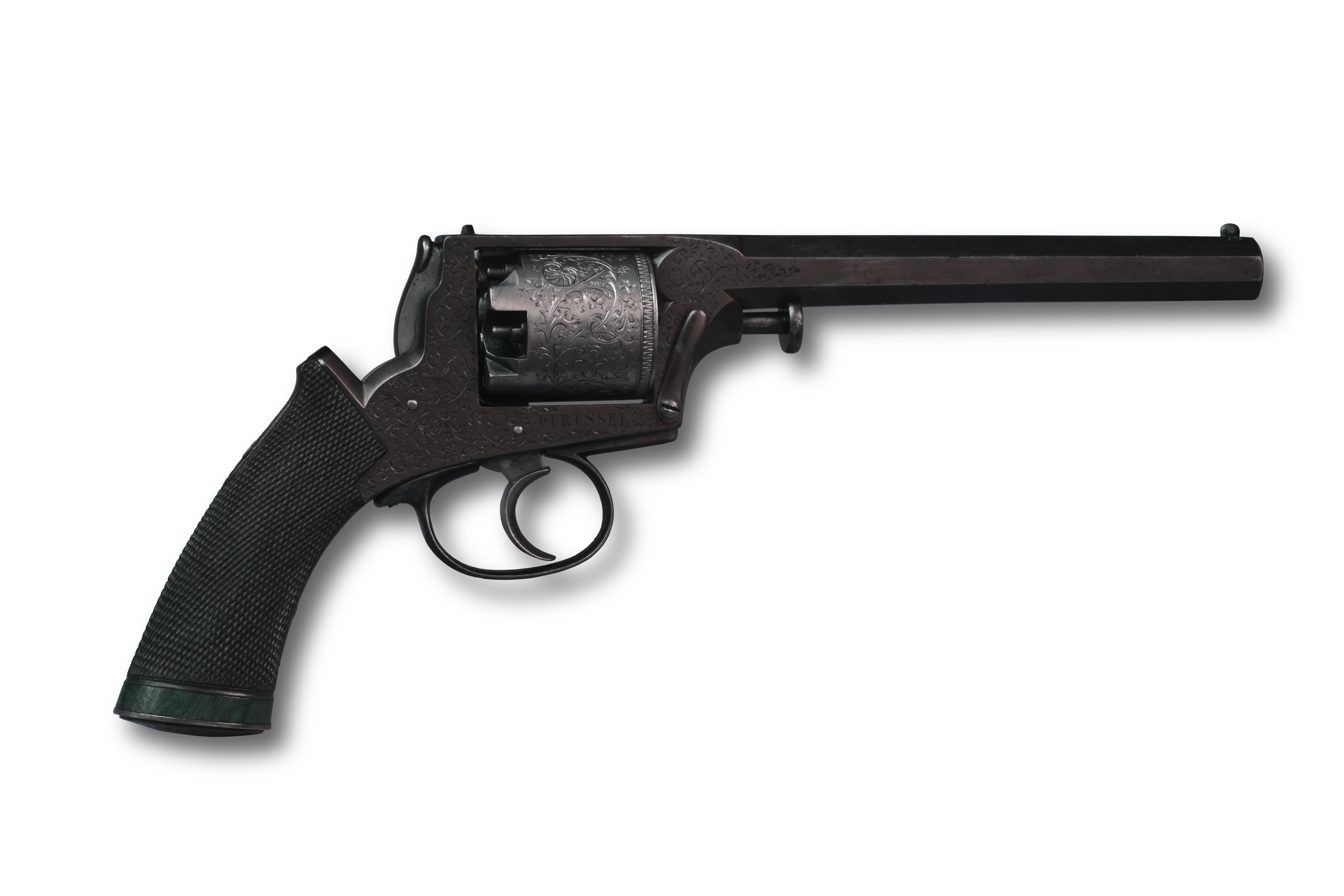
Adams revolver: hammer is without thumb projection, as it cannot be cocked by hand.

The Adams revolver, also known as the Deane-Adams revolver, is a black powder, double-action, percussion revolver. Introduced in 1851, it was the first revolver designed and produced in the United Kingdom. It was heavily used by British officers during the Crimean War (1853–1856) and the Indian Rebellion of 1857. It was the precursor of the more advanced Beaumont-Adams revolver, designed in 1856. After 1867, the production of breechloading Adams revolvers began, and many existing Adams and Beaumont-Adams revolvers were converted to breechloaders, using .450 Boxer centerfire cartridges. From 1872 to 1880, these revolvers (conversions and new breechloaders) were adopted as the official sidearms of the British Army and Navy and were in use until the 1880s.

== Percussion revolvers ==
Since the production of the first Colt revolvers in 1836 up to 1851, the American Colt's Manufacturing company held a monopoly in revolver production in the United States and Europe. Between 1853 and 1857, Colt established a factory in London, supplying British customers with cheap, mass-produced revolvers with interchangeable, machine-produced parts. Colt even obtained some government contracts, selling 4,000 revolvers to the British Navy in 1854 and 14,000 to the British Army in 1855.

As Colt's English patents expired in 1851, British designer Robert Adams made his own version of the revolver and patented it the same year, making a successful presentation of his design at the Great Exhibition of London in 1851. The weapons were tested by the official British military commission for the adoption in the British Army, although none was ultimately selected, due to the revolver's high price, equivalent to several single-shot percussion pistols commonly used in the military at the time.

== Characteristics ==
=== Double-action trigger ===
Unlike contemporary Colt revolvers, whose hammer had to be cocked manually before every shot, the Adams revolver had a double-action trigger mechanism: pulling the trigger simultaneously cocked the hammer, rotated the cylinder, and fired the shot. This selfcocking revolver feature enabled a high rate of fire, although it required a heavy pull on the trigger, which made it almost impossible to aim the weapon except at point-blank range. Also, it was not possible to cock the hammer manually, and the hammer had no thumb projection. However, the British military commission found the double-action trigger mechanism superior to the Colt's single-action.

=== Solid frame ===
Adams revolvers had a solid, one-piece frame with an integral barrel, all made from a single piece of steel, which gave them inherent strength and durability, although they were somewhat more expensive to produce, as their production required skilled workers. The British military commission found this construction superior to the Colt's multi-part open-frame revolver design, which was seen as inherently weaker and prone to break under pressure.

=== High rate of fire and stopping power ===
Although the Adams revolver was rejected as an official British military weapon, its characteristics were well appreciated by the British public, soldiers and civilians alike, and many officers privately purchased the revolver at their own expense, along with the most popular contemporary revolver, the Colt 1851 Navy. As such, Adams revolvers saw heavy combat in Crimean war (1853–1856) and Indian Mutiny of 1857. In these conflicts, Adams revolvers were deemed slightly better in some situations than Colts, due to their higher rate of fire at close range and slightly better stopping power (due to their larger caliber, 0.44 vs 0.36 in the Colt Navy). However, power and performance still lacked when compared to the newer models of the 1848 Colt Dragoon produced the same year. In 1860, one officer of the 88th Regiment wrote a letter to Robert Adams, praising his pistols:

I had one of your largest-sized Revolver Pistols at the bloody battle of Inkermann, and by some chance got surrounded by Russians. I then found the advantages of your pistol over that of Colonel Colt's, for had I to cock before each shot I would have lost my life. I should not have had time to cock, as they were too close to me, being only a few yards from me: so close that I was bayoneted through the thigh immediately after shooting the fourth man. I hope this may be of service to you, as I certainly owe my life to your invention of the Revolver Pistol.

In April 1896, Lieutenant Colonel G. V. Fosbery commented about an incident with a Colt Navy revolver during the Indian Rebellion of 1857:

An officer, who especially prided himself on his pistol-shooting, was attacked by a stalwart mutineer armed with a heavy sword. The officer, unfortunately for himself, carried a Colt's Navy pistol, which, as you may remember, was of small caliber, and fired a sharp-pointed picket bullet of 60 to the pound and a heavy charge of powder, its range being at least 600 yards, as I have frequently proved. This he proceeded to empty into the sepoy as he advanced, but, having done so, he waited just one second too long to see the effect of his shooting, and was cloven to the teeth by his antagonist, who then dropped down and died beside him. My informant, who witnessed the affair, told me that five of the six bullets had struck the sepoy close together in the chest, and had all passed through him and out at his back.

=== Criticism ===
Early Adams revolvers had three widely reported deficiencies, which were resolved in later models:

- No recoil shield on the breech behind the cylinder. Recoil shields were common in early British revolvers (e.g. Tranter and Beaumont-Adams). The lack of a shield left the shooter exposed to hot gases and percussion cap fragments during firing. Colt's massive standing breech was much better.
- Low accuracy at medium and long distances, as the hammer could not be cocked by hand. That problem was addressed by Tranter revolvers in 1853 and Beaumont-Adams revolvers in 1856.
- No loading lever on early models: the slightly smaller balls were pressed into the cylinder chambers by fingers, which made them flimsy and prone to fall out on their own. A loading lever mounted on the left side of the frame was added in later models.

== Breechloading revolvers ==
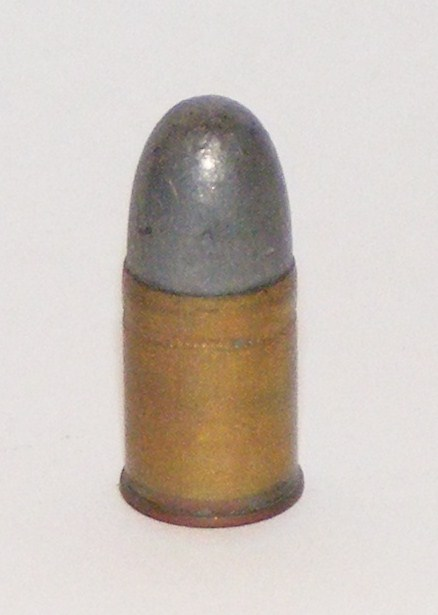
.450 Adams centerfire cartridge.

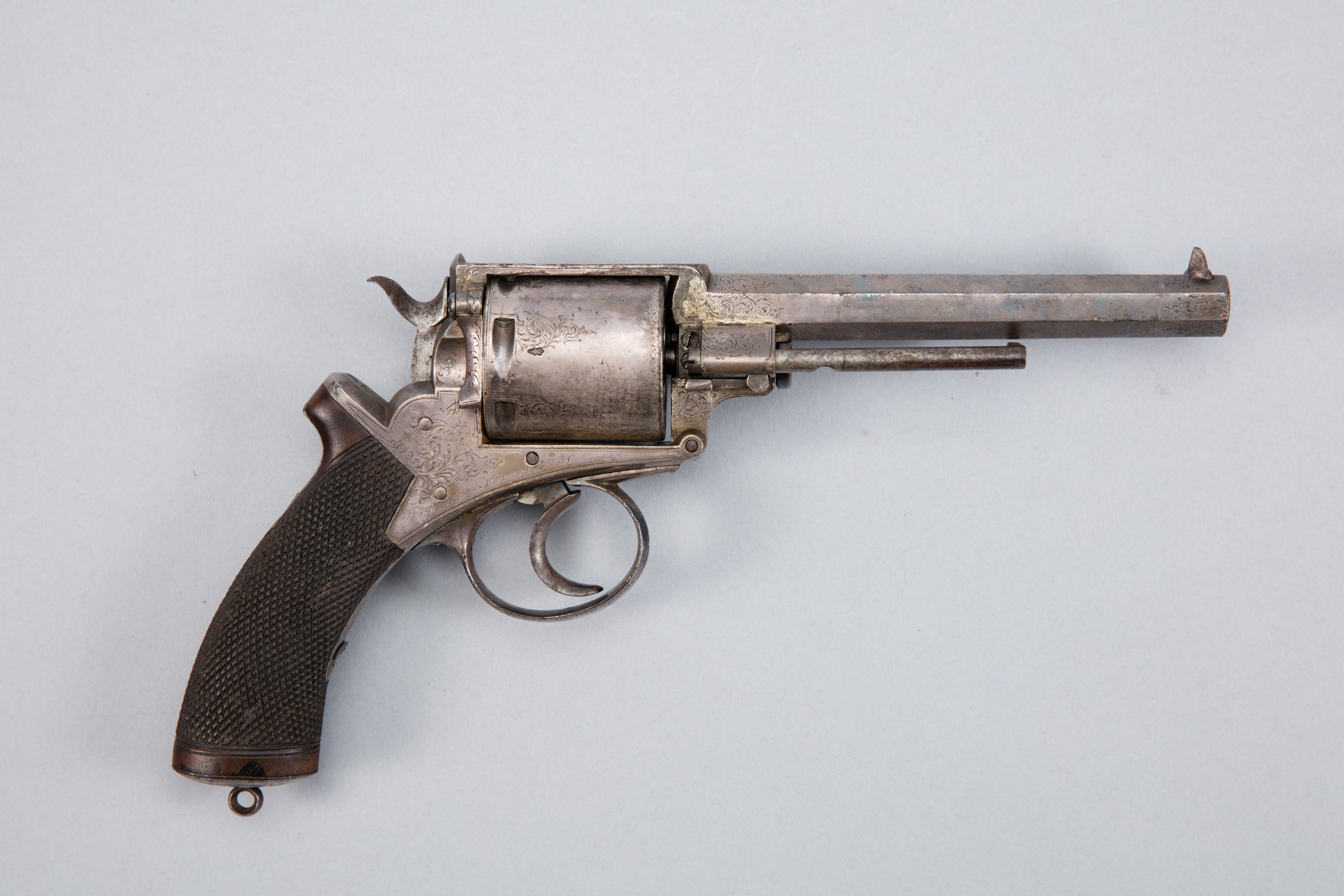
Adams breechloading 6-shot revolver Mark II, made in 1869. The most visible difference is the addition of the loading gate and the ejector rod with its sleeve.

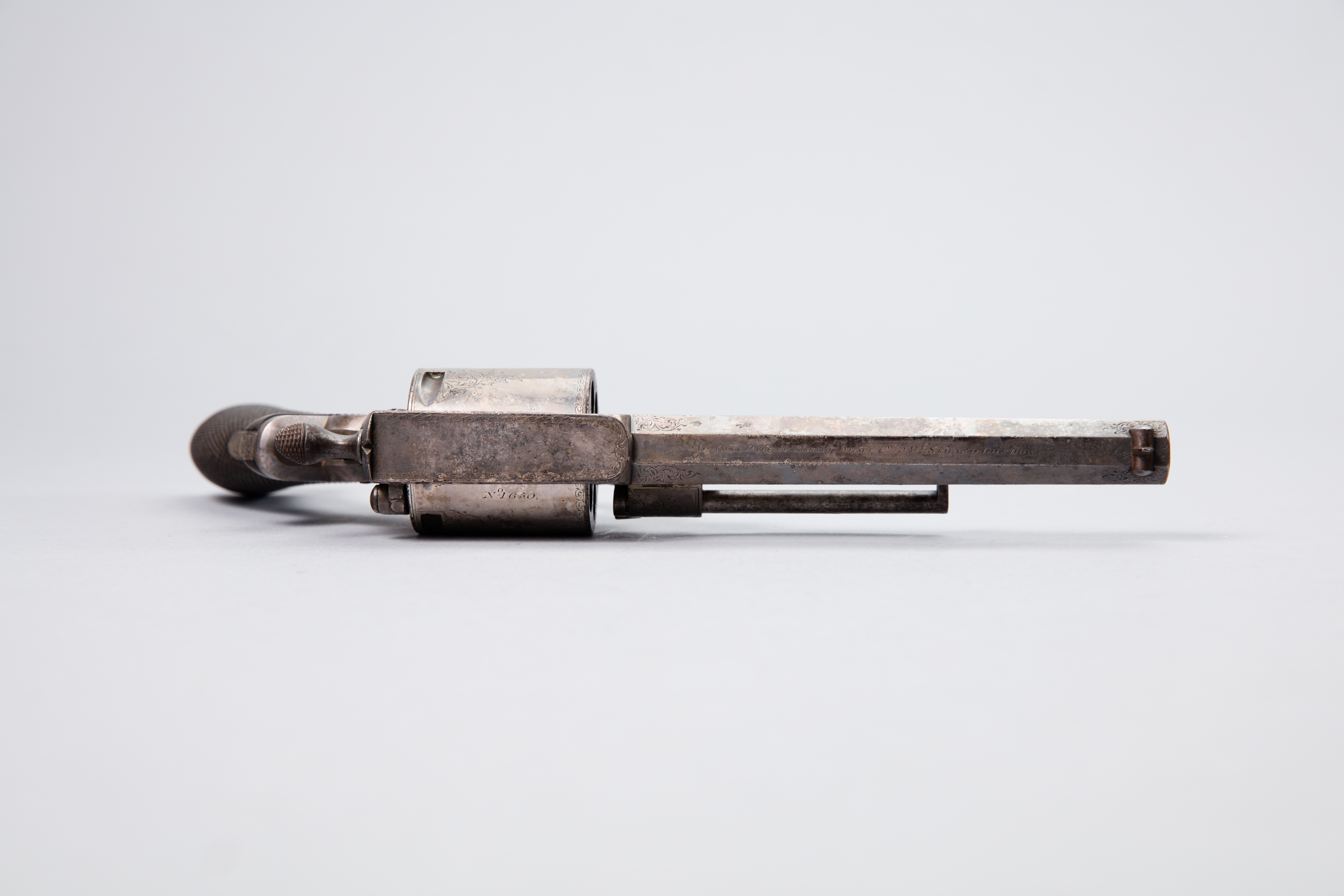
The same revolver, from the top. Ejector rod and the loading gate are clearly visible.

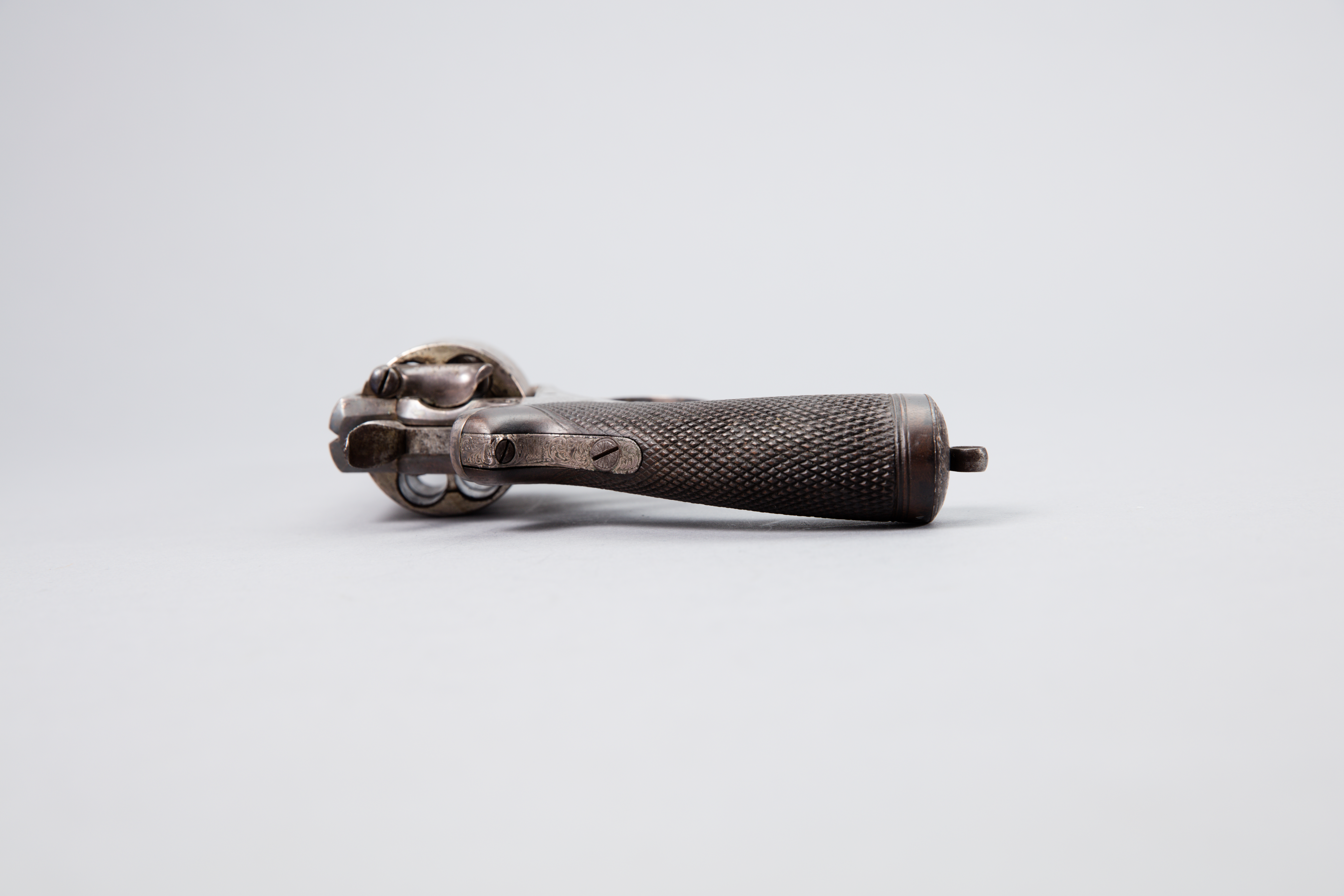
The same revolver, from the back. Bored-through, breechloading cylinder and the loading gate are both clearly visible.

Beginning in 1867, Adams Patent Small Arms Company of London started the conversion of the existing percussion revolvers into breechloaders using .450 Boxer centerfire cartridges, and simultaneously, the production of new breechloading revolvers began.

=== Mark I ===
The adaptation of the old percussion revolvers included several operations:

- replacement of the cylinder (with a bored-through, five-chambered breechloading cylinder)
- replacement of the hammer (adding a hammer with a firing pin)
- addition of a loading gate behind the cylinder on the right side
- removal of the rammer
- addition of a simple ejector rod in a horizontal sleeve (tube) attached to the front of the revolver frame, in front of the cylinder. By pushing this rod back, the empty cartridges were ejected one by one through the loading gate.

=== Mark II ===
Along with adaptation of the so-called Mark I revolvers, the production of new breechloading revolvers, called Mark II, began in 1867. The main difference compared to the conversion revolvers was the six-shot cylinder and a somewhat improved cartridge ejector.

=== Mark III ===
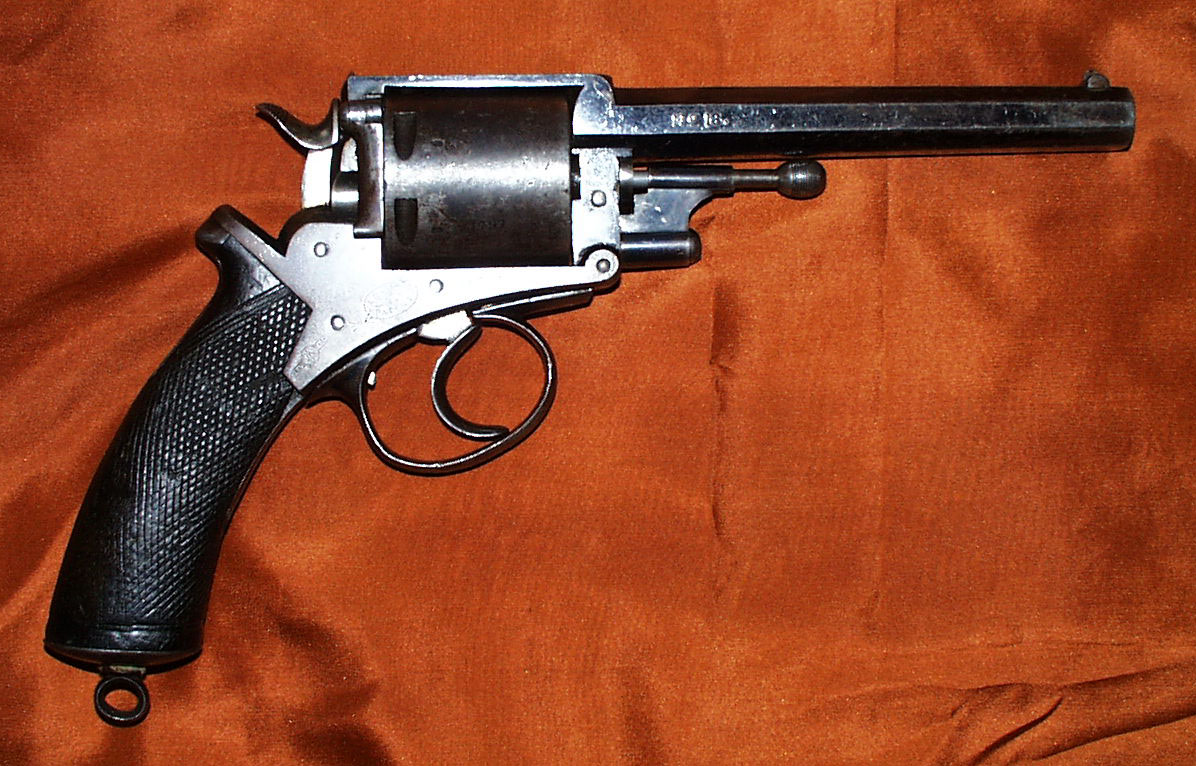
British Army Mark III Model of 1872.

In 1872, a new model was produced, called Mark III. It was similar to its predecessor, but had a shorter cylinder and a more durable cartridge ejector. A new ejector rod was mounted on a yoke under the barrel and mostly housed in the hollow cylinder arbor, so it could be pulled out and swung to the right when needed. From 1872 to 1880, all of these revolvers (conversions and new breechloaders) were adopted as official sidearms of the British Army and Royal Navy, and were in use until the 1880s.

== Service history ==
Adams and Beaumont-Adams caplock revolvers, privately purchased by British officers, were used in the field during Crimean War (1853–1856) and the Indian Rebellion of 1857. They were used as a self-defence weapon in battle and praised for their high rate of fire and stopping power. After 1868, Adams centerfire cartridge revolvers were issued to British officers, non-commissioned officers, and horsemen as official sidearms. They were used extensively in the Anglo-Zulu War (1879). Practical use showed that these revolvers were not accurate at distances greater than 25 yards, and that the .450 Adams cartridge was often unable to stop the charge of heavily built opponents in hand-to-hand combat. For those reasons, the British government in 1880 adopted the new, stronger .476 Enfield ammunition, and a new service revolver for it – the Enfield.

== Literature ==
- Kinard, Jeff (2003). Pistols, An Illustrated History of Their Impact. Santa Barbara, California: ABC-CLIO, Inc. ISBN 1-85109-475-X.
- Laband, John (2009). Historical dictionary of the Zulu wars. Historical dictionaries of war, revolution, and civil unrest. Lanham, Maryland: Scarecrow Press. ISBN 978-0-8108-6078-0. OCLC 276930370.
- Myatt, Frederick (1981). An Illustrated Guide to Pistols and Revolvers. London: Salamander Books Limited. ISBN 0-86101-097-3.
- Roberts, Frederick Sleigh Roberts (1924). Letters written during the Indian mutiny. Harold B. Lee Library. London: Macmillan and Co., limited.
- Zhuk, A. B. (1995). Walter, John (ed.). The illustrated encyclopedia of handguns, pistols and revolvers of the world, 1870 to 1995. Translated by Bobrov, N. N. London: Greenhill Books. ISBN 1-85367-187-8.
