= Adamston, West Virginia =

Coordinates: 39°17′26″N 80°21′28″W

Adamston, West Virginia is a former town in Harrison County, West Virginia, incorporated in 1903. It was the former site of a Baltimore & Ohio Railroad depot and a post office. It is now a neighborhood of Clarksburg, West Virginia.

Adamston was named for Josias Adams, the original owner of the town site. It attained some national attention in 1912 when it elected a Socialist mayor and city government, some of whom were re-elected in 1915. Among the contributing factors in the victory, according to later analysis, were the strong involvement of the window glass factory workers, and the commitment of a large portion of the Belgian-American population of the town.

In 1917, Adamston, along with Broad Oaks, North View (where Progressives had had success) and Stealer Heights, was annexed to Clarksburg. It was generally understood that part of the reason for annexation was to diminish the political power of glassworker enclaves in these small municipalities.

== Sources ==
- McClennen, Molly Ann, and Stephen Edward Cresswell. Socialists in a Small Town: The Socialist Victory in Adamston, West Virginia. Buckhannon, West Virginia: Ralston, 1992.
