= Justice Adams =

Justice Adams may refer to:

- Annette Abbott Adams (1877–1956), American judge who served by special assignment on one case in the California Supreme Court
- Alto Adams (1899–1988), justice for the Florida Supreme Court
- Austin Adams (lawyer) (1826–1890), justice of the Iowa Supreme Court
- Andrew Adams (politician) (1736–1797), chief justice of the Connecticut Supreme Court
- Charles Bayley Adams (1887–1961), justice of the Vermont Supreme Court
- Clark J. Adams (1904–1981), justice of the Michigan Supreme Court
- Natalie Adams (born 1965), justice of the Supreme Court of New South Wales
- Oscar W. Adams Jr. (1925–1997), associate justice of the Supreme Court of Alabama
- Paul L. Adams (Michigan judge) (1908–1990), justice of the Michigan Supreme Court
- Rowland K. Adams (1889–1944), justice of the Maryland Court of Appeals
- Samuel B. Adams (1853–1938), justice of the Supreme Court of Georgia
- Washington Adams (1814–1883), justice of the Supreme Court of Missouri

== See also ==
- Judge Adams (disambiguation)
