= Adamsdale =

Adamsdale may refer to:

== Places ==
- Adamsdale, Massachusetts
- Adamsdale, Ontario
- Adamsdale, Pennsylvania

== People ==
- Will Adamsdale
