= All Dulles Area Muslim Society =

Mosque in Sterling, Virginia, United States

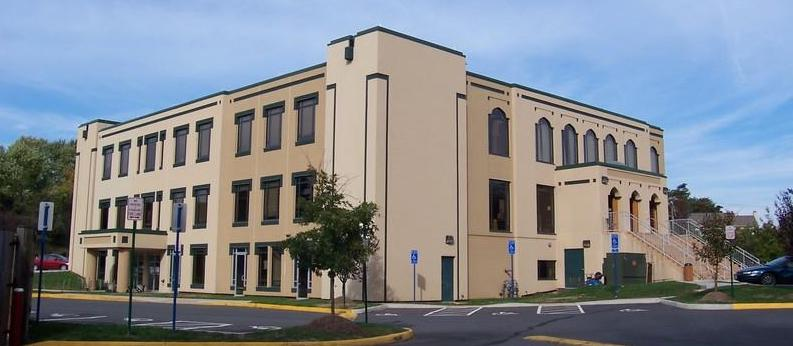

- Location in Virginia All Dulles Area Muslim Society (the United States)

Religion
- Affiliation: Islam
- Ecclesiastical or organizational status: non-profit religious organization

Location
- Location: 46903 Sugarland Rd, Sterling, VA 20164
- Interactive map of All Dulles Area Muslim Society
- Coordinates: 39.00639°N 77.37936°W

Architecture
- Type: Mosque
- Established: 1983

Specifications
- Capacity: 700+
- Dome: 0
- Minaret: 0
- Site area: 25,000 square feet

Website
- www.adamscenter.org

All Dulles Area Muslim Society (ADAMS) is one of the largest mosques in the United States, located in Sterling, VA and serving 5000 Muslim families. ADAMS offers a wide variety of services. Some are of religious nature such as Islamic and Arabic classes, while others are of communal nature such as Boy and Girl Scout activities.

The current Executive Director (for 25 years as of 2022) is Imam Mohamed Magid, a leading figure in the American Muslim community. Magid was criticized in 2024 for taking part in an iftar with Linda Thomas-Greenfield, who is known for blocking measures in the UN calling for a halt to attacks against the people of Gaza, Palestine.
