= Mount Adams =

Mount Adams most often refers to:

- Mount Adams (Washington) (3,743 m), a volcano in the Cascade Mountain Range, and the second highest mountain in Washington state.

== Other mountains ==
- Mount Adams (New Hampshire) (1,760 m) in the White Mountains near Mount Washington, second highest in New England
- Mount Adams (Colorado) (4,248 m) in the Rocky Mountains near the Crestones
- Mount Adams (Montana) (2,344 m), a mountain in Flathead County, Montana
- Mount Adams (New York) (1,073 m)
- Mount Adams (New Zealand) (2,208 m)
- Mount Adams (Western Australia) (258 m)
- Chief peak of Adams Mountains, Antarctica

== Other uses ==
- Mount Adams, Cincinnati, a neighborhood in the Ohio city, centered on the eponymous hill
- Mount Adams (Bel Air, Maryland), a house on the National Register of Historic Places

== See also ==
- Mount Quincy Adams (disambiguation)
- Mount Adam (disambiguation)
