= Adams Peak =

Adams Peak may refer to the following places:

- Adams Peak (Antarctica)
- Adams Peak (California)
- Adam's Peak or Sri Pada, a holy mountain in Sri Lanka

== See also ==
- Sripada (disambiguation)
