= Adamsville, Gallia County, Ohio =

Unincorporated community in Ohio, U.S.

Coordinates: 38°52′31″N 82°21′20″W

Adamsville is an unincorporated community in Gallia County, in the U.S. state of Ohio.

== History ==
Adamsville was platted in 1837.
