= Adams, Kentucky =

Unincorporated community in Kentucky, United States

- Unincorporated community
- Location in Kentucky Location in the United States
- Coordinates: 37°55′2″N 82°42′28″W
- Country: United States
- State: Kentucky
- County: Lawrence
- Elevation: 646 ft (197 m)
- Time zone: UTC-5 (Eastern (EST))
  - Summer (DST): UTC-4 (EDT)
- ZIP codes: 41201
- GNIS feature ID: 507374

Adams is an unincorporated community located in Lawrence County, Kentucky, United States.
