= Adams County =

Adams County is the name of twelve counties in the United States. Most are named for one of two presidents, John Adams or his son, John Quincy Adams:

- Adams County, Colorado
- Adams County, Idaho
- Adams County, Illinois
- Adams County, Indiana
- Adams County, Iowa
- Adams County, Mississippi
- Adams County, Nebraska
- Adams County, North Dakota
- Adams County, Ohio
- Adams County, Pennsylvania
- Adams County, Washington
- Adams County, Wisconsin
