= Adamsville, Sumter County, Florida =

Adamsville
- Unincorporated community
- Location within the state of Florida Adamsville (the United States)
- Coordinates: 28°47′59″N 82°01′14″W
- Country: United States
- State: Florida
- County: Sumter
- Elevation: 75 ft (23 m)
- Time zone: UTC-5 (Eastern (EST))
  - Summer (DST): UTC-4 (EDT)
- ZIP codes: 34785
- Area code: 352
- GNIS feature ID: 294645

Adamsville is an unincorporated community located in Sumter County, Florida, United States. The community is served by the 34785 ZIP Code.

== Geography ==
Adamsville is bordered by Coleman to the west; Lake County to the east; Wildwood to the north, and Sumterville to the south.

== Education ==
The community of Adamsville is served by Sumter County Schools, which serves the entire county.
