= Adams (1905 automobile) =

Adams was an English automobile manufactured in Bedford, England, between 1905 and 1912 under the brand names Adams-Hewitt and later just Adams.

== Arthur Adams ==
Arthur Henry Adams was born in Boston, Massachusetts, in 1868. He became a qualified mechanical engineer with a degree from the Massachusetts Institute of Technology. First, working for Western Electric Company, then moving to Paris to install the city's telephone system. In 1899, Adams moved to London and joined the Sturtevant Engineering Company, which manufactured fans and air handling equipment.

== Edward Hewitt ==
Edward Ringwood Hewitt was born in New Jersey in 1866. His grandfather was Peter Cooper, who had built the first American steam locomotive. Hewitt studied chemistry at Princeton University and the University of Berlin. He had helped Sir Hiram Maxim to build a large steam plane in 1894. On his return to the States, Hewitt designed and patented an automobile. At some point, he met with Adams, and in 1904, the two decided to manufacture it.

== Adams Manufacturing Company ==
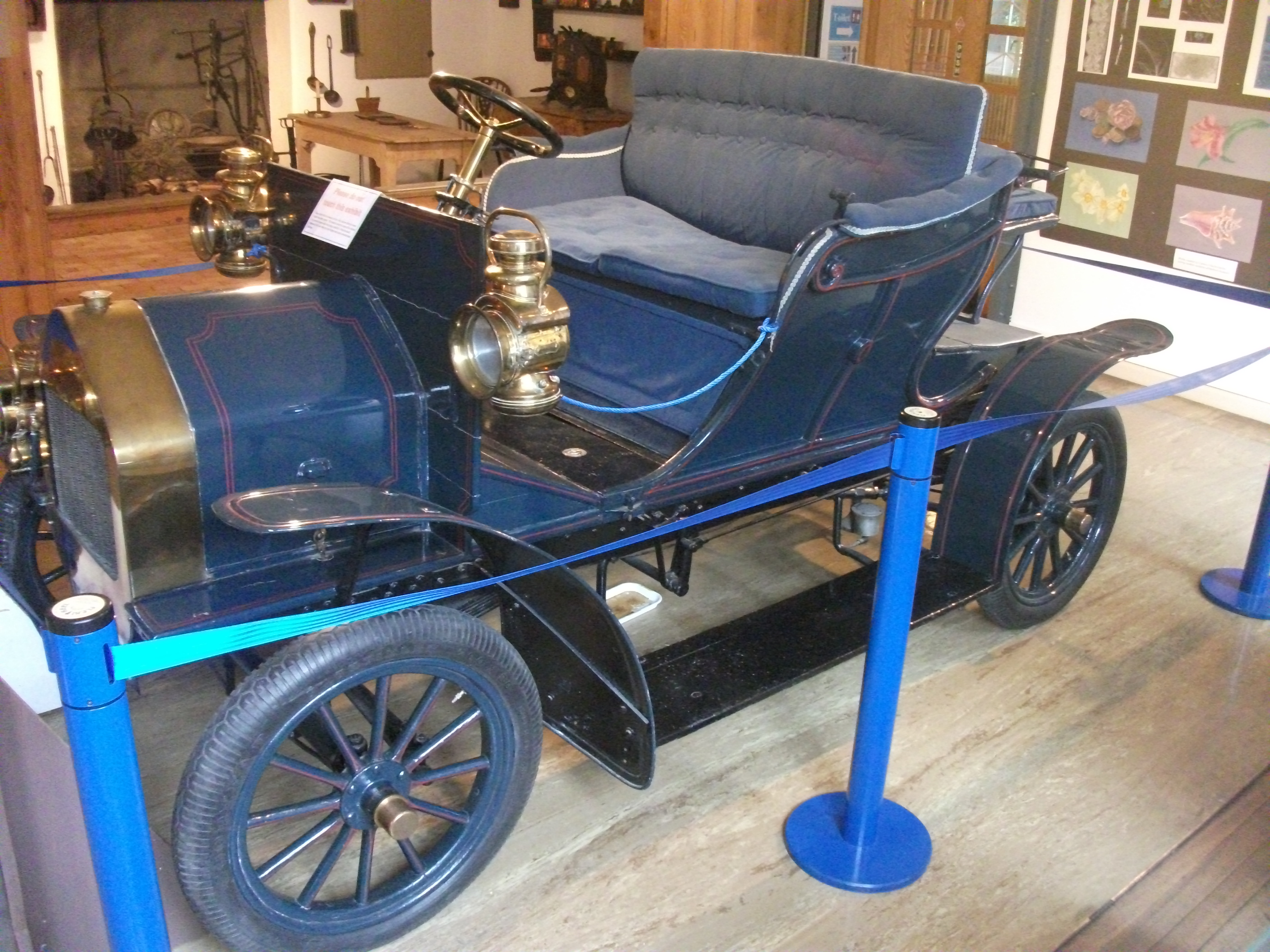
1907 Adams

Adams and Hewitt set up the Adams Manufacturing Company, registering it on 1 April 1905. There first car was produced by the end of that year as a Adams-Hewitt. It was a "gas buggy" along the lines of an Oldsmobile and following agreement with Adams production of the car started in 1905 as the Adams-Hewitt. The car had a supposedly foolproof two, later three, speed-epicyclic transmission with a 1724 cc 10 hp single-cylinder engine located horizontally in the middle of the chassis driving the rear wheels by chain. Indeed, "Pedals to push, that's all" was used as the marque's slogan. Hewitt returned to the United States, setting up the Hewitt Motor Company of New York to manufacture similar cars under his own name and his name was dropped from the British produced cars.

In 1906 a range of more conventional cars was introduced with shaft-drive and vertical engines and from 1907 sliding mesh gearboxes. One of these was supplied to the Emperor of Abyssinia. Models offered included two- and four-cylinder ones and one of the first British V-8s; this last had a 7270 cc 35/40 hp engine based on the French Antoinette model (an aero engine for which Adams were agents). The V-8 seems to have been plagued by crankshaft breakages. The last single-cylinder cars were made in 1909.

In 1910, the company produced an advanced 16 hp four-cylinder model with front-wheel brakes; it came with compressed-air starting, tire-inflating, and jacking equipment. The "pedals-to-push" gear was still offered, as was a conventional four-speed transmission and an unusual planetary gearchange (three-speed), which was operated by a pedal that moved in a gate.

Adams also manufactured commercial vehicles, including taxicabs and three-quarter ton lorries; these were also based on Hewitt designs.

The company went into voluntary liquidation in and stopped making vehicles in 1912.

== Ingranic Electric Company ==
With end of vehicle production Adams changed to the manufacture of electrical components under the name the Ingranic Electric Company. This eventually became Brookhirst-Igranic which eventually became part of Metal Industries, Limited. It continued in business until 1990.

== Lusitania ==
Returning from a journey to New York, Adams was lost in the sinking of the Lusitania in 1915.

== See also ==
- List of car manufacturers of the United Kingdom
