= Neals Diggins, California =

Extinct community in California, U.S.

Coordinates: 39.5413°N 121.5247°W

Neals Diggins (also, Neals Diggings; later, Adamstown, Adamsville, and Adams Bar) is a former settlement and mining camp in Butte County, California, United States. It was located on the Feather River upstream of Oroville, on the opposite bank from Long's Bar. It was founded by Sam Neal, a local rancher, in 1848. Later that year, George Adams re-established the place and named it for himself.
