= Robert Adams (handgun designer) =

British gunsmith (1810–1870)

- Born: 31 December 1809; Marldon, Devonshire, England
- Died: 13 September 1870 (aged 59); Camberwell, Surrey, England
- Occupation: Gunsmith
- Known for: Double-action revolver

Robert Adams (1 December 1809 – 13 September 1870) was a 19th-century British gunsmith who patented the first successful semi-double-action revolver in 1851. His revolvers were used during the Crimean War, the Indian Mutiny, the American Civil War, and the Anglo-Zulu War.

== Career ==
=== Deane and Adams ===
London Armoury Company
- Type: Privately held company
- Industry: Firearms
- Predecessor: George & John Deane
- Founded: On or about August 22, 1851
- Founder: Robert Adams
- Fate: Defunct
- Headquarters: London, U.K
- Area served: Worldwide
- Key people: John Adams
- Products: Military pistols

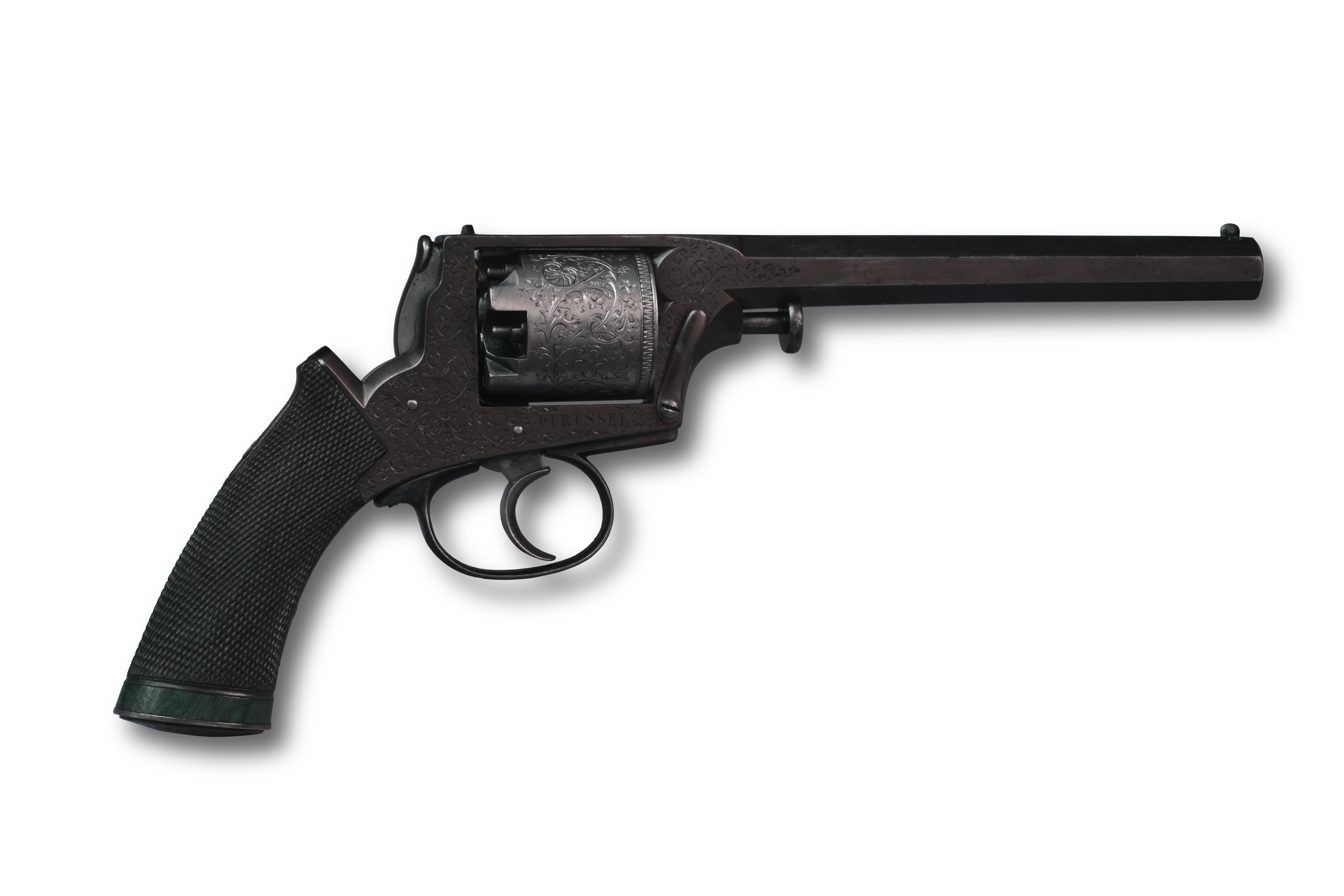
Adams Revolver, made by Durussel in Morges circa 1860. On display at Morges military museum

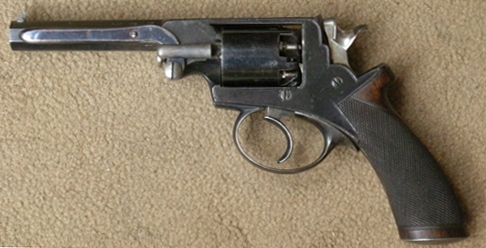
Adams cal .36 revolver

Adams was the manager for the London arms manufacturers George & John Deane. On August 22, 1851, he was granted a British patent for a new revolver design.

The .436 Deane and Adams was a five-shot percussion (cap-and-ball) revolver with a spurless hammer, and the first revolver with a solid frame. The revolver used a double-action only system in which the external hammer could not be cocked by thumbing it back, like most other pistols of the era, but instead cocked itself when the trigger was pulled. This made it possible to fire the gun much more rapidly than contemporary single-action revolvers, such as the Colt, which had to be cocked before each shot.

Deane and Adams's revolver was shown at the Great Exhibition of 1851 and subsequently approved by the British Army's Small Arms Committee in addition to being adopted by the East India Company for use by their cavalry. Orders for the revolver were great enough to prompt the Deane brothers to make Adams a partner in their firm, which became Messrs. Deane, Adams, and Deane.

Although highly regarded, the hand-crafted Adams revolver was more expensive than Colt's mass-produced guns. It lacked a recoil shield behind the cylinder, which left the shooter's hand subject to powder burns resulting from "blowback" caused by the sometimes unpredictable black powder of the era. The lack of a hammer spur was criticized since the longer trigger pull of the Adams made it significantly less accurate than the Colt. Furthermore, the Adams's nipples, upon which the percussion caps were set, were unhardened and sometimes burst upon firing. Its cumbersome design made quick drawing a difficult feat compared to other revolvers of the time.

An "Improved Frame" model was offered in 1854, presenting both a sleeker look and more comfortable grip. In that same year the British Board of Ordnance reviewed the Adams together with other percussion revolvers with a view to adopting one as an official service sidearm. Concerns about the gas escape between the cylinder and barrel during discharge resulted in no decision being made. Nevertheless, British officers purchased the Adams privately and the gun proved its worth in battle during the Crimean War.

=== Beaumont–Adams ===
In 1855, a veteran of the Crimean conflict, Lieutenant Frederick E.B. Beaumont, improved the gun by linking the trigger to a spurred hammer, permitting both single- and double-action fire. A new version of the revolver, the Beaumont–Adams, was produced and became so popular that it is said Samuel Colt was almost forced to shut down his London manufactory as a result.

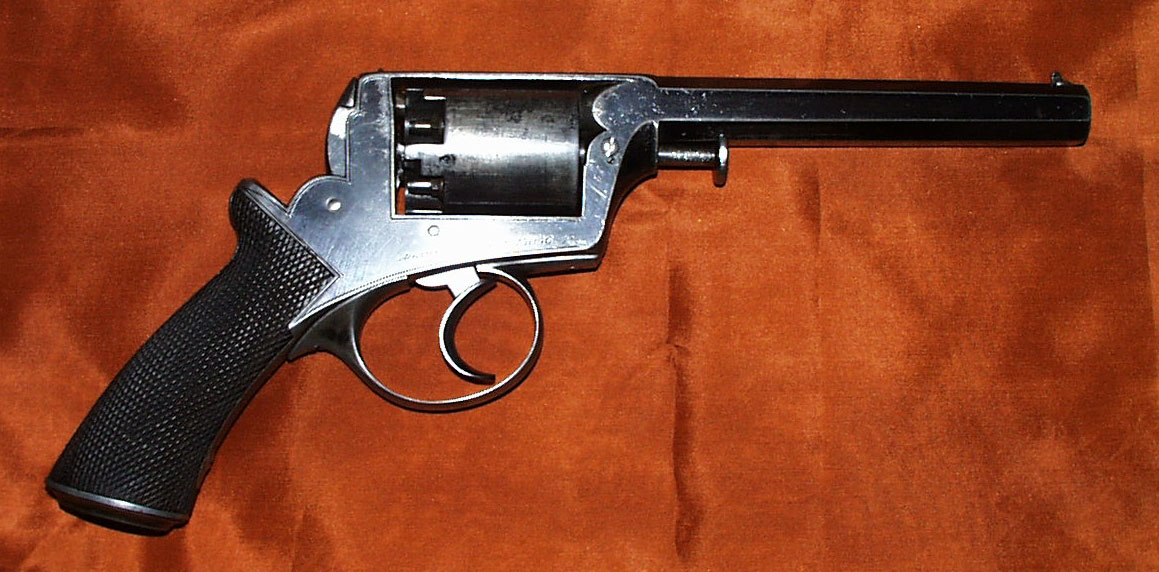
An Improved Frame Model of 1854

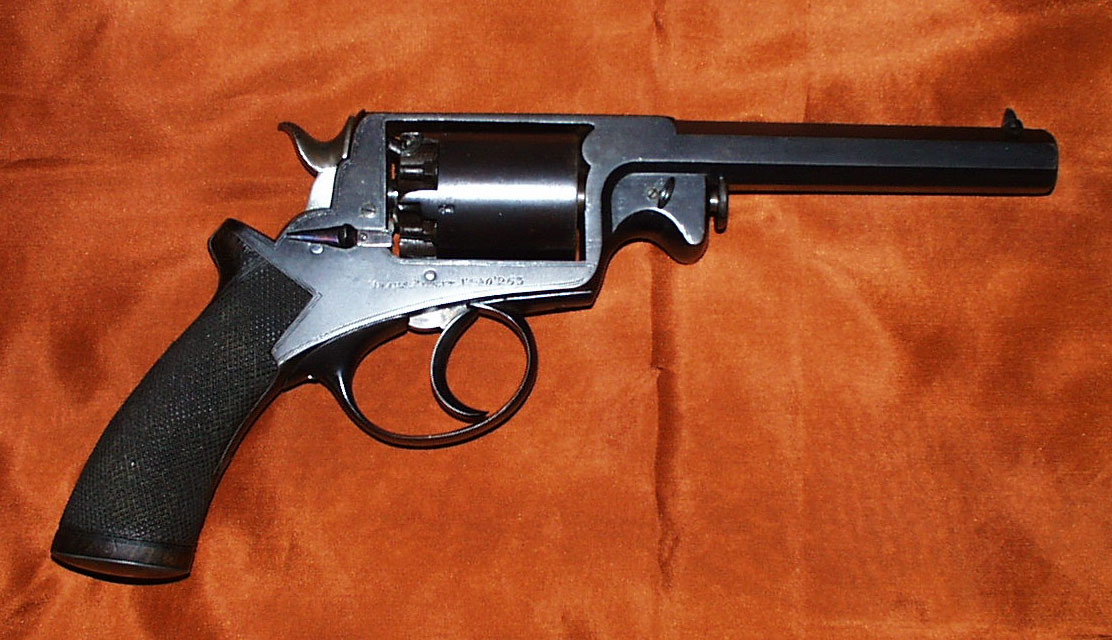
A Beaumont–Adams

=== London Armoury Company ===
Adams had a falling out with the Deane brothers the following year and founded a new arms concern, the London Armoury Company, on February 9, 1856. Another important stockholder was Adams's cousin, James Kerr, who later invented the Kerrs Patent Revolver. The factory was established on the former site of the South-Eastern Railway Company in the Bermondsey section of London.

The Indian Mutiny of 1857 established the Adams as the official revolver of the British Army. In the bitter fighting it was found that rapid fire was more important than accuracy, and the man-stopping power of the Adams's large caliber bullet was also valued.

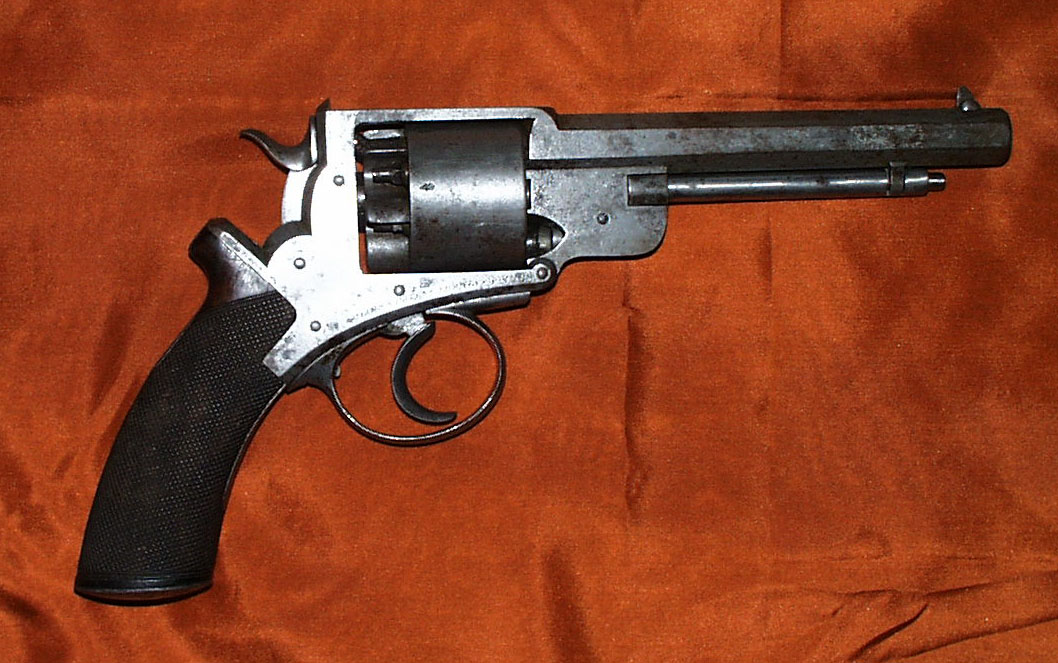
Last Adams percussion, Model of 1866

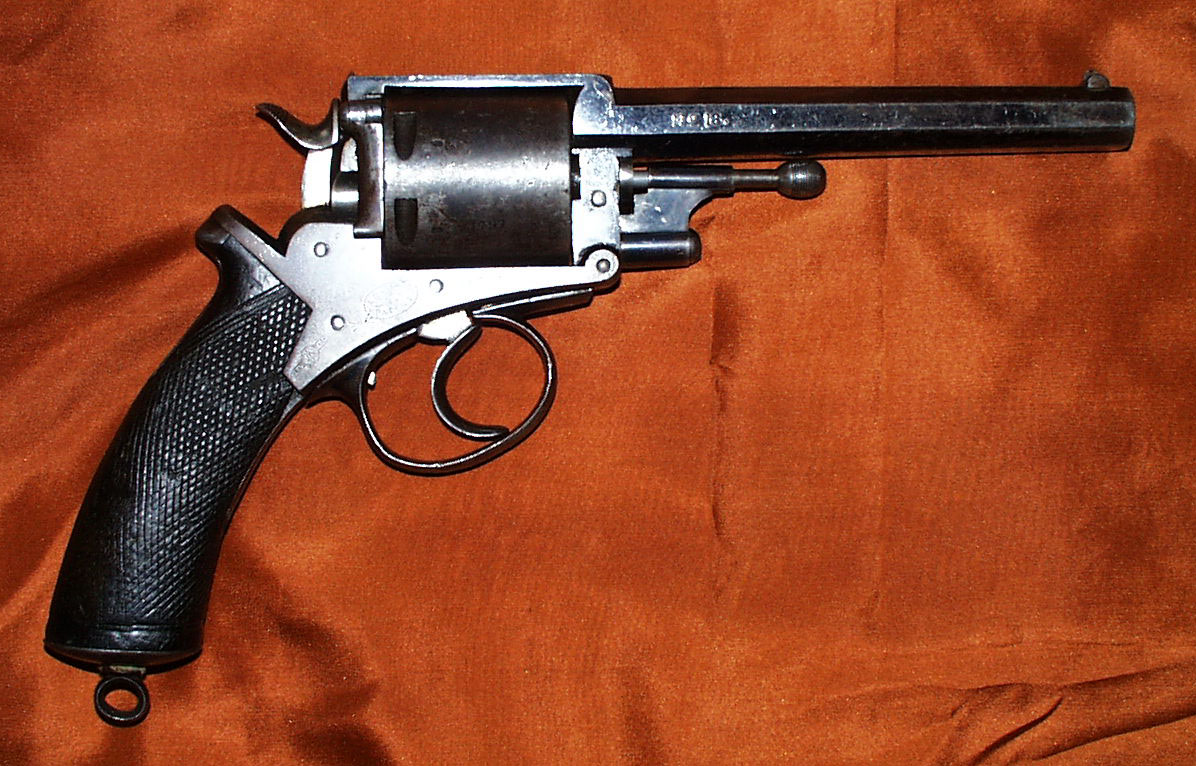
British Army Mark III, Model of 1872

Several variations and improvements were made upon the Adams, which was manufactured in Europe and briefly in the United States under license. The majority of British-made Adams guns seem to have been in 54 bore (approximately .44 caliber), but several smaller and at least one larger bore were also offered. In 1857 the U.S. government purchased 100 revolvers in .36 caliber and another 500 from the Adams-licensed Massachusetts Arms Company. The 100 British-made guns were issued to the U.S. Army with the rest held in storage until issued at the outbreak of the U.S. Civil War. In addition Adams revolvers were purchased from the London Armoury prior to and during the war by individual states and the U.S. and Confederate governments.

The London Armoury Company flourished due to the manufacture of the Adams revolver, however, in 1859 the company's board of directors decided to increase the production of infantry rifles, decreasing revolver production. Adams disagreed with the decision, selling his stock and leaving the company. Kerr then became the armoury's dominant figure and his revolver, together with a large number of rifles, were sold to the Confederate government which became the armoury's principal client. With the fall of the Confederacy the fortunes of the company declined and it went into receivership in 1866.

Adams owned the rights to his revolver, which the London Armoury Company had only produced under license, and he now manufactured them in Birmingham, with minor improvements keeping his revolvers in competition with other designs.

=== John Adams ===
In 1867, Robert Adams's brother John Adams patented a breech-loading revolver which was adopted by the British government in place of the Beaumont–Adams. It was a solid frame pistol with six chambers, in .450 caliber. After official acceptance of his pistol, Adams left the London Armoury Company and established his own factory, the Adams Patent Small Arms Company. His pistol was manufactured in three distinct variations (differences related mainly to methods of spent cartridge ejection) between 1867 and about 1880. The models were tested and adopted by the British Army and Navy, with the last, the M1872 Mark III, seeing the widest use.

The John Adams revolver remained the official sidearm of the British Army until replaced by the Enfield Mark I in 1880.
