= Beaumont–Adams revolver =

Former British Army weapon

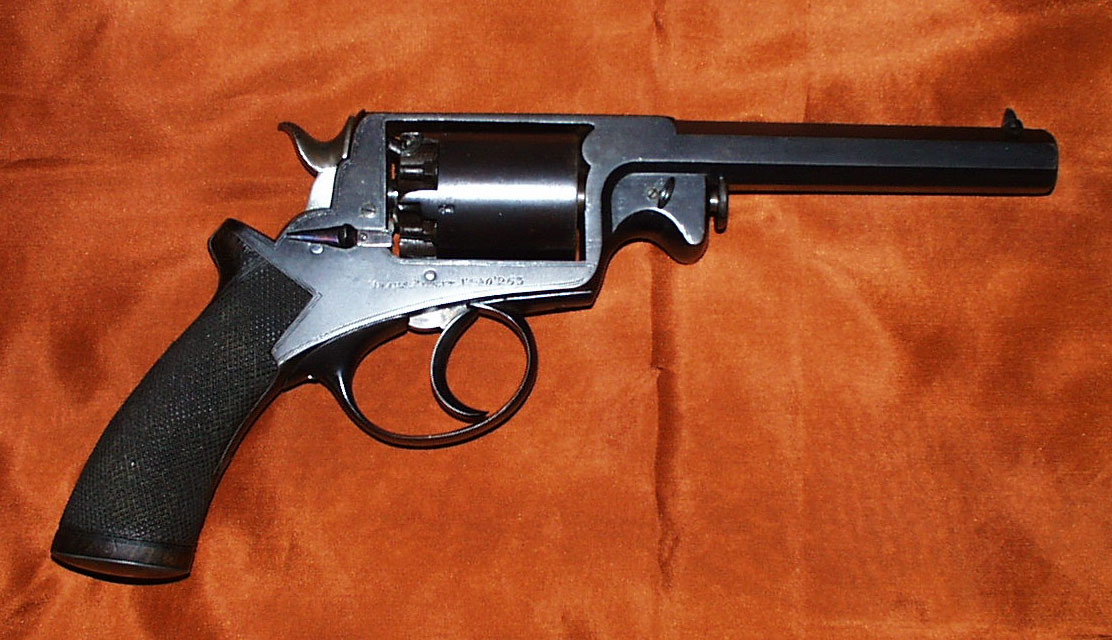
- Beaumont–Adams percussion revolver
- Type: Revolver
- Place of origin: United Kingdom

Service history
- In service: 1862–1881
- Used by: United Kingdom & Colonies; North-West Mounted Police; United States; Confederate States; Empire of Japan
- Wars: American Civil War; Boshin war Anglo-Zulu War; First Boer War numerous British colonial conflicts

Production history
- Designer: Lt. Beaumont (Royal Engineers), Robert Adams
- Designed: 1862
- Manufacturer: Robert Adams of London
- Produced: 1862–1880
- No. built: c. 250,000

Specifications
- Mass: 2.4 lb (1.1 kg), unloaded
- Length: 11.25 in. (286 mm)
- Cartridge: .450 Adams Boxer centerfire cartridge (conversion)
- Calibre: Percussion; United Kingdom:.500 in (12.7 mm) (38-bore), .479 in (12.2 mm) (42-bore), .442 in (11.2 mm) (54-bore) & .320 in (8.1 mm) (120-bore); United States:.36 in caliber & .31 in caliber
- Action: Double-action
- Muzzle velocity: 620 ft/s (190 m/s)
- Effective firing range: 35 yd (32 m)
- Maximum firing range: 100 yd (91 m)
- Feed system: 5-round cylinder
- Sights: Fixed front post and rear notch

The Beaumont–Adams revolver is a black powder, double-action, percussion revolver. Originally adopted by the British Army in .442 calibre (54-bore, 11.2 mm) in 1856, it was replaced in British service in 1881 by the .476 calibre (11.6 mm) Enfield Mk I revolver.

== History ==
On 20 February 1855, Lieutenant Frederick E. B. Beaumont of the Royal Engineers was granted a British patent for improvements to the Adams revolver which allowed them to be cocked and fired either by manually cocking the hammer as in single-action revolvers or by just pulling the trigger. Beaumont was granted a US Patent (no. 15,032) on 3 June of the next year.

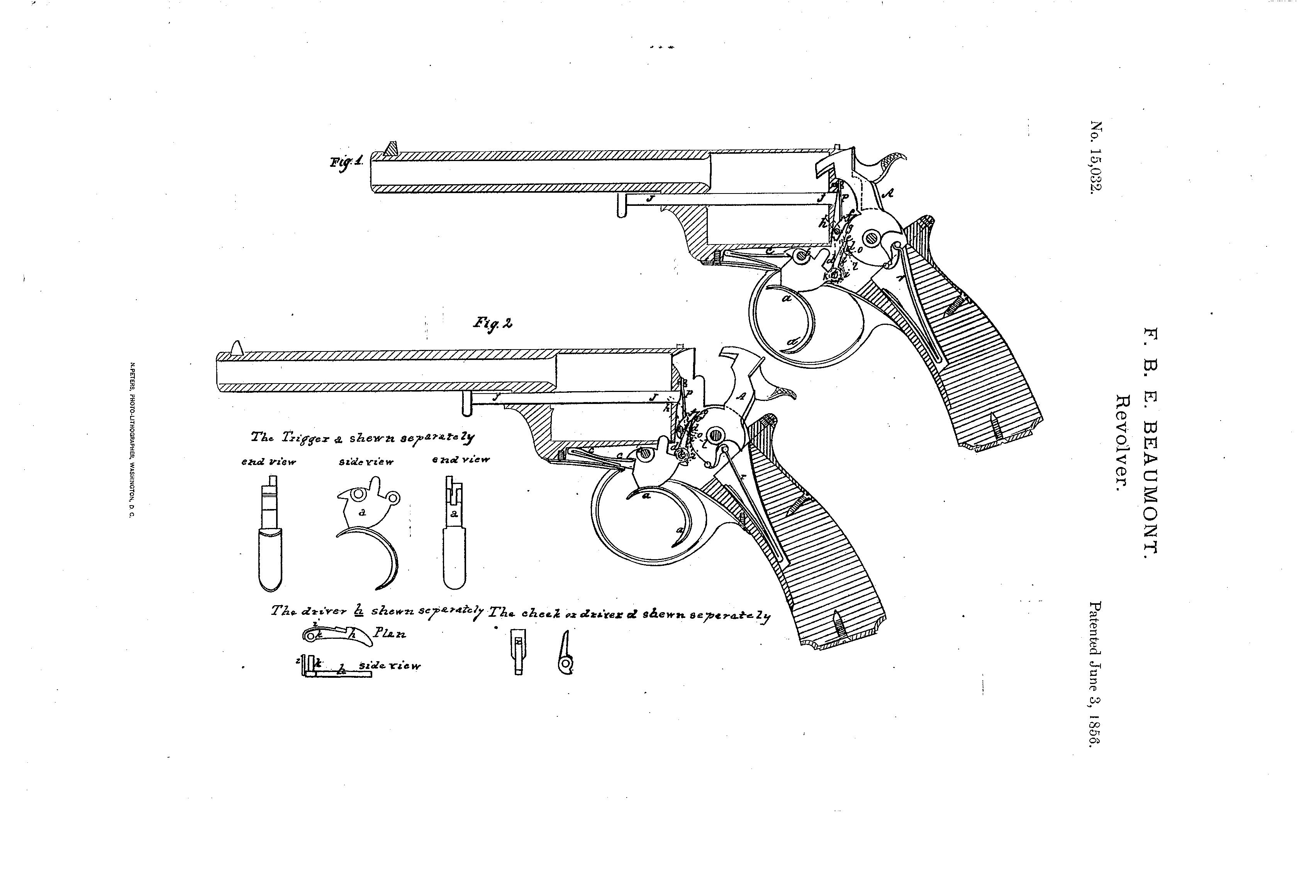

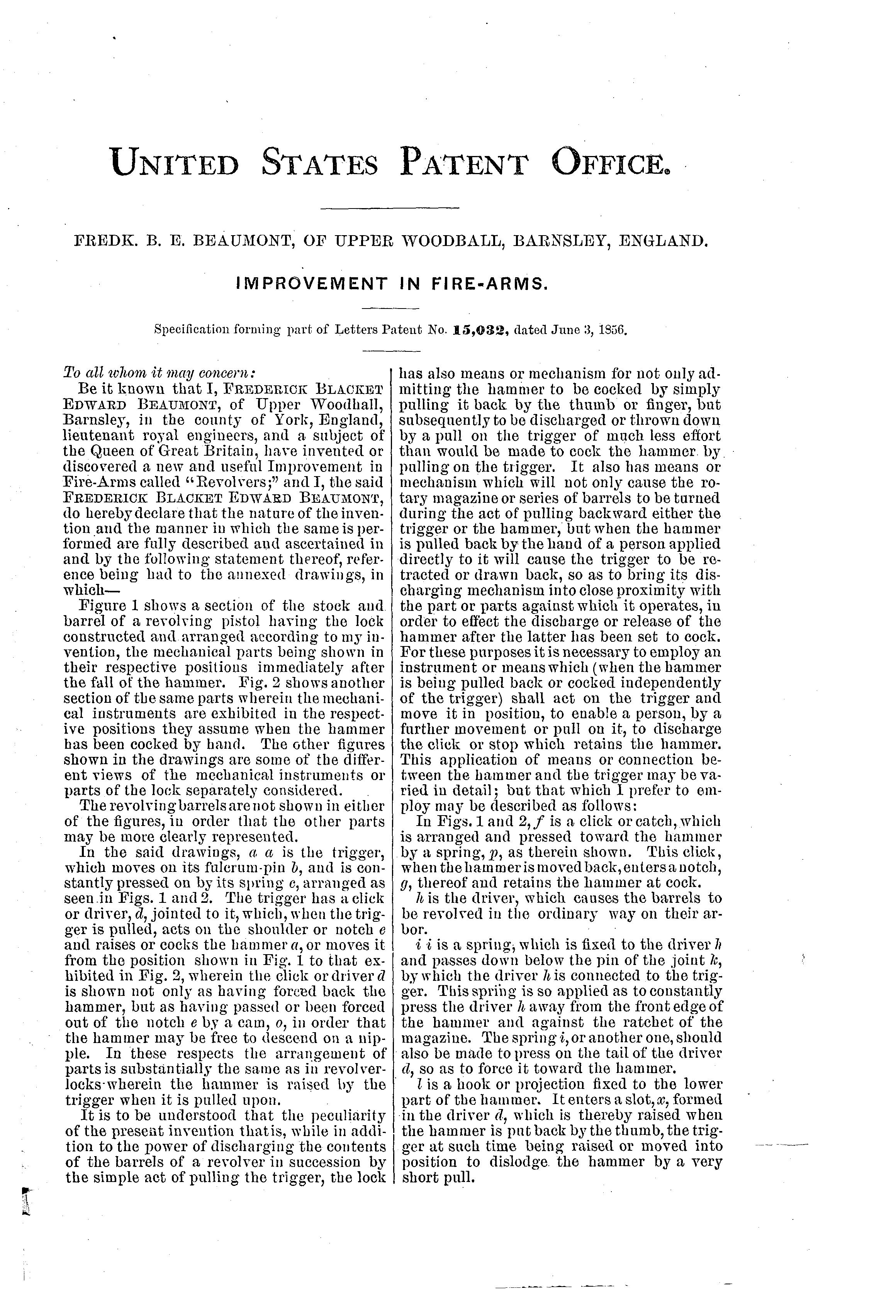

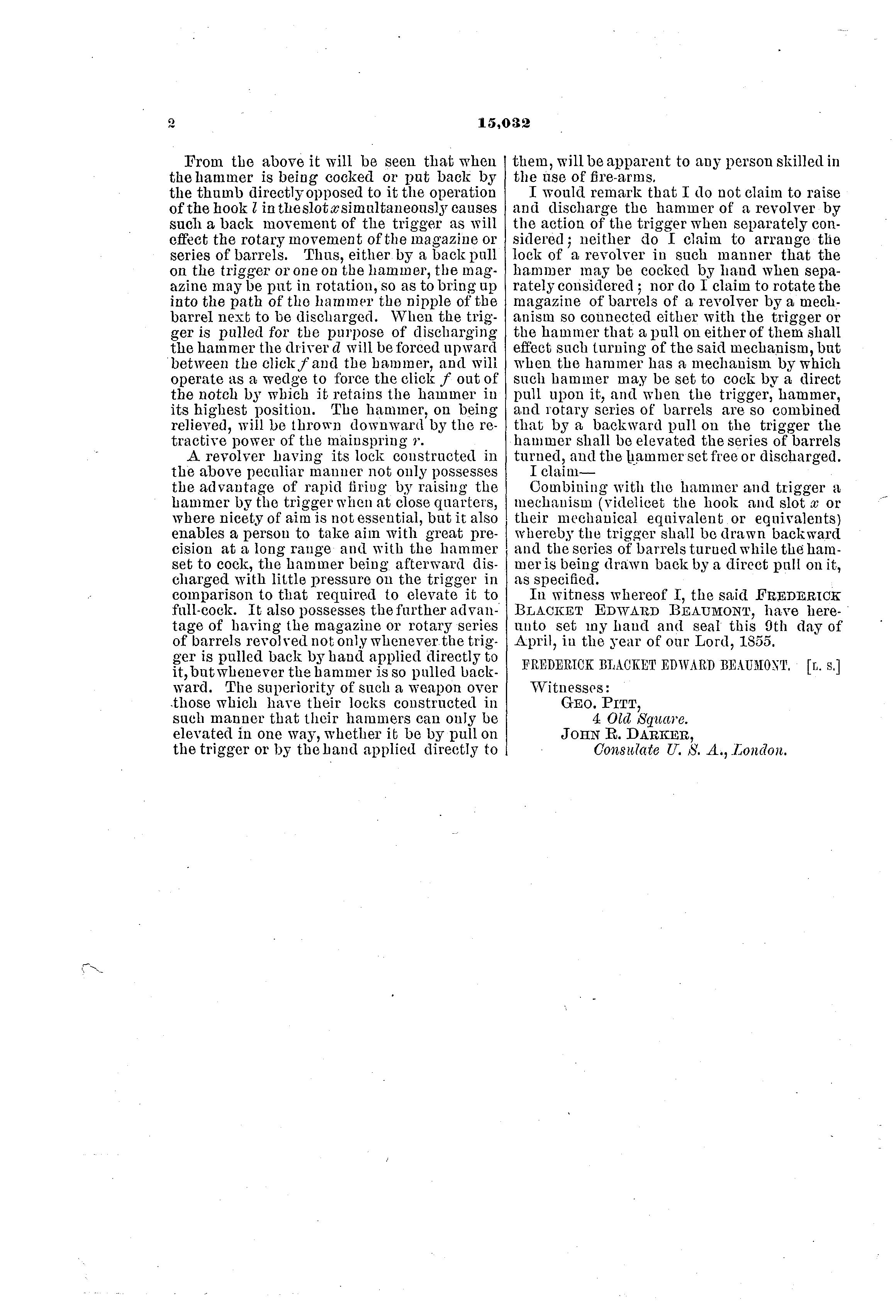

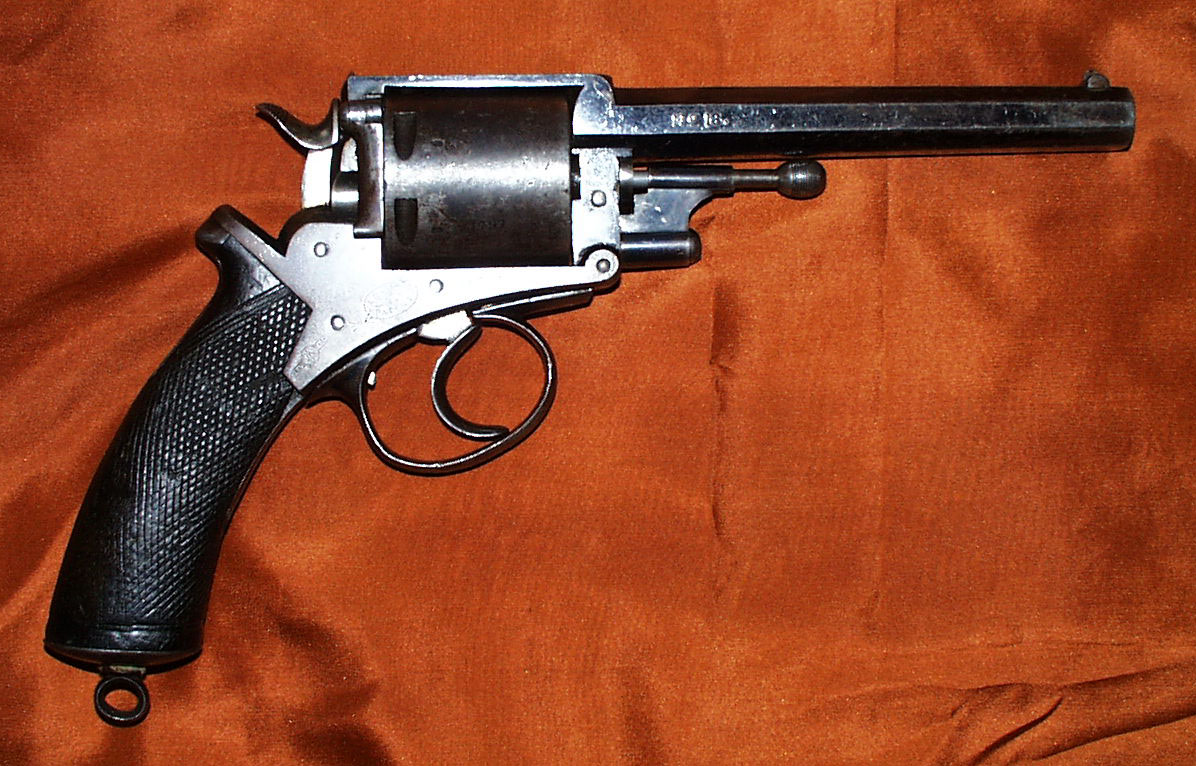
British Army Mark III, Model of 1872

At that time there was intense competition between Adams and Colt, which was rapidly expanding its sales and had opened a London factory competing with the British firearms trade, manufacturing firearms with interchangeable parts. The older 1851 and 1854 Adams revolvers were self-cocking, also known as double-action. The Adams revolver was favoured by British officers in the Crimean War and colonial conflicts due to the stopping power of its larger 54 bore (.442 cal) bullet (compared with their main competitor, the smaller .36 cal Colt Navy revolvers), and the speed of the Adams trigger-cocking action for close-quarters fighting (over the more cumbersome Colt action).

In partnership with George and John Deane, the company of Deane, Adams & Deane produced the new revolver in a variety of calibres and sizes, from pocket pistols to large military versions. The United Kingdom officially adopted the 54-bore (.442 calibre) Beaumont–Adams in 1856, Holland and Russia following soon after. To meet the growing demand for its weapons, Deane, Adams & Deane contracted companies in Birmingham and Liége to manufacture their weapons under licence. The new revolver gave Robert Adams a strong competitive advantage and Samuel Colt shut his London factory due to a drop in sales.

In the US, the Massachusetts Arms Company was licensed to manufacture about 19,000 units of the revolver in .36 calibre, of which about 1,750 were purchased by the Union Army at the beginning of the American Civil War. They also made a pocket version in .31 calibre.

In 1867, Robert Adams' brother John Adams patented a breech-loading revolver which was adopted by the British government in place of the Beaumont–Adams. It was a solid frame pistol with six chambers, in .450 caliber. After official acceptance of his pistol, Adams left the London Armoury Company and established his own factory, the Adams Patent Small Arms Company. His pistol was manufactured in three distinct variations (differences related mainly to methods of spent cartridge ejection) between 1867 and about 1880. The models were tested and adopted by the British Army and Navy, with the last, the M1872 Mark III, seeing the widest use.

The John Adams revolver remained the official sidearm of the British Army until replaced by the Enfield Mark I in 1881.
