= .44 caliber =

Family of firearm cartridges and firearms

.44 caliber is a family of large-caliber firearm cartridges and firearms, particularly revolvers. The most well-known is the .44 Magnum which uses a 0.429 to 0.430 inch diameter bullet, depending on jacket or cast. Though less common than the smaller .38 caliber family of cartridges, the caliber is popular with many shooters and the .44 Magnum in particular facilitated the rise of handgun hunting. Its role as the most powerful handgun cartridge has been superseded by various recently developed .45 caliber and .50 caliber handgun chamberings.

The caliber was also common in American Civil War-era cap & ball revolvers such as the Colt Army Model 1860 and the Remington Model 1858, offering more stopping power than the .36 caliber revolvers of the time. Notably, the derringer that John Wilkes Booth used to assassinate Abraham Lincoln was .44 caliber.

== Cartridges ==
The following dimensions are given in millimeters (inches).

=== Handguns ===
Handgun cartridge dimensions
Name	Case type	Bullet diameter		Neck diameter		Base diameter		Rim diameter		Case length		Overall length	
Name	Case type	mm	in	mm	in	mm	in	mm	in	mm	in	mm	in
.44 S&W Special	rimmed straight	10.89	.429	11.61	.457	11.61	.457	13.06	.514	29.46	1.16	41.15	1.62
.44 Remington Magnum	rimmed straight	10.89	.429	11.61	.457	11.61	.457	13.06	.514	32.78	1.29	40.89	1.61
.44 S&W Russian	rimmed straight	10.89	.429	11.61	.457	11.61	.457	13.08	.515	24.64	.97	36.32	1.43
.44 S&W American	rimmed straight	11.02	.434	11.13	.438	11.18	.440	12.85	.506	23.11	.91	36.58	1.44
.44 Webley (.442 R.I.C.)	rimmed straight	11.07	.436	11.94	.470	11.99	.472	12.78	.503	17.53	.69	27.94	1.10
.44 Bulldog	rimmed straight	11.18	.440	11.94	.470	12.01	.473	12.78	.503	14.48	.57	24.13	.95
.44 Colt	rimmed straight	11.25	.443	11.43	.450	11.58	.456	12.27	.483	27.94	1.10	38.1	1.50
.44 AMP	rimless straight	10.9	.429	11.6	.457	11.9	.470	11.9	.470	33	1.298	41	1.6
.44 Remington Centerfire	rimmed straight	11.4	.447	11.4	.447	11.4	.448	12.2	.480	27.1	1.065		
.429 DE	Rebated, bottleneck	10.89	.429	11.71	.461	13.8	.543	13.1	.515	32.56	1.282	39.12	1.54

=== Rifles ===
Rifle cartridge dimensions
Name	Case type	Bullet diameter		Neck diameter		Base diameter		Rim diameter		Case length		Overall length	
Name	Case type	mm	in	mm	in	mm	in	mm	in	mm	in	mm	in
.44-40 Winchester	rimmed bottleneck	10.85	.427	11.25	.443	11.96	.471	13.33	.525	33.27	1.31	39.37	1.55
.444 Marlin	rimmed straight	10.9	.429	11.51	.453	11.91	.469	13.06	.514	54.91	2.162	65.28	2.57
.44 Henry	rimmed straight	11.33	.446	11.00	.434	11.20	.441	13.20	.518	22.9	.903	34.2	1.345

== See also ==
- 11 mm caliber – Firearm cartridge classification
- Table of handgun and rifle cartridges – Small arms cartridge data
