= Frontier Bulldog =

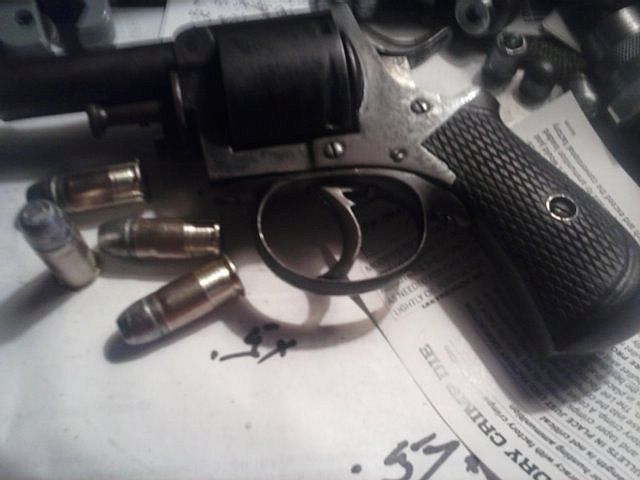
- Belgian Western Bulldog revolver
- Type: Revolver
- Place of origin: Belgium

Production history
- Manufacturer: J.B. Rongé & Sons
- Unit cost: $3.80 US
- Produced: c. 1875 – 1914

Specifications
- Barrel length: 2 1/2 inch
- Cartridge: .442 Webley, .450 Adams & .44 S&W American
- Action: Double-action
- Feed system: 5 shot
- Sights: fixed sights

The Frontier Bulldog, Western Bulldog, or American Bulldog is a 5-shot, .44 S&W American, double action, 2 1/2-inch barrel snubnosed revolver made by the Belgian firm J.B. Rongé & Sons of Liège, and primarily sold in the United States, from late 1870s to 1914, through the Sears-Roebuck and Montgomery Ward mail-order catalogs. The base price was US$3.80, compared to $12 for a Smith & Wesson Model 3 Double Action in the same calibre. It is an improved copy of the Philip Webley & Son of Birmingham British Bull Dog revolver.

The Bulldog included a cartridge ejector and a loading port on the right side of the body. The sights were fixed, and the barrel was generally rounded and sometimes had a flat top. The grips were checkered wood, embossed/molded hard rubber, or other materials, and a lanyard ring was sometimes fitted to the butt. The Bulldog is also chambered for the British .442 Webley and .450 Adams cartridges. The .44 Bull Dog was a popular American cartridge that was a shorter and less powerful cartridge that could also be fired from .442 Webley caliber revolvers.

Numerous copies and variants of this design (authorized and unauthorized) were made in Belfast, Belgium, Spain, Pakistan, France and the United States during the late 19th century, occasionally chambered in .32 short colt, as well as different calibre cartridges. American copies were manufactured by the firms of Forehand & Wadsworth, Iver Johnson and Harrington & Richardson.
