= Bulldog revolver =

Bulldog revolver may refer to:

- British Bull Dog revolver, a 19th-century gate-loading, double-action snubnosed revolver made by Philip Webley & Son of Birmingham.
- Frontier Bulldog, Belgian made copies of the Webley Bull Dog revolver.
- Charter Arms Bulldog, a 20th-century swing-out cylinder double-action snubnosed revolver.
- A snubnosed revolver (colloquially known as a "snubbie", "belly gun" or "bulldog revolver") is any small, medium or large frame revolver with a short barrel, generally 3 inches or less in length.
