= Service weapon =

Service weapon may refer to:

- Service pistol, any handgun issued to regular military personnel or law enforcement officers
- Service rifle, a rifle a military issues to its regular infantry
