= 10.9 =

10.9 may refer to:

- OS X 10.9, the version number of the Apple operating system OS X Mavericks
- .44 caliber, ammunition of 10.9 mm caliber
