= 11 mm caliber =

Firearm cartridge classification

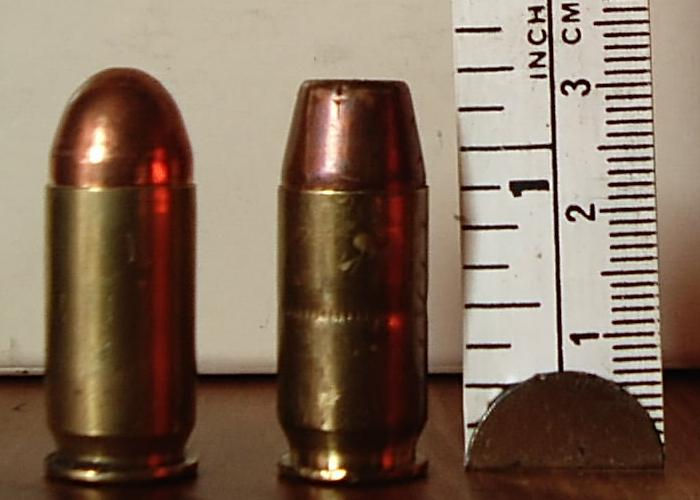
- Example of an 11 mm cartridge, two .45 ACP rounds
- Firearm cartridges
- « 9 mm, 10 mm 11 mm 12 mm, 13 mm »

This is a list of firearm cartridges which have bullets in the 11 millimetres (0.43 in) to 11.99 millimetres (0.472 in) caliber range.

- Length refers to the cartridge case length
- OAL refers to the overall length of the cartridge
- Bullet refers to the diameter of the bullet

All measurements are in millimetres (with inches in parentheses).

== Pistol cartridges ==
Name	Case type	Bullet diameter	Neck diameter	Base diameter	Rim diameter	Case length	Overall Length
.45 ACP (.45 Auto)	Rimless, straight	11.48 mm (0.452 in)	12.09 mm (0.476 in)	12.09 mm (0.476 in)	12.09 mm (0.476 in)	22.81 mm (0.898 in)	32.4 mm (1.28 in)
.45 GAP	Rimless, straight	11.48 mm (0.452 in)	12.09 mm (0.476 in)	12.09 mm (0.476 in)	12.09 mm (0.476 in)	19.18 mm (0.755 in)	27.18 mm (1.070 in)
.45 Remington–Thompson	Rimless straight	11.35 mm (0.447 in)	11.94 mm (0.470 in)	11.99 mm (0.472 in)	11.96 mm (0.471 in)	28.45 mm (1.120 in)	27.18 mm (1.070 in)
.45 Super	Rimless straight	11.48 mm (0.452 in)	12.0 mm (0.47 in)	12.09 mm (0.476 in)	12.2 mm (0.48 in)	22.81 mm (0.898 in)	32.4 mm (1.28 in)
.45 Winchester Magnum	Rimless, straight	11.48 mm (0.452 in)	12.01 mm (0.473 in)	12.09 mm (0.476 in)	12.19 mm (0.480 in)	30.43 mm (1.198 in)	40.00 mm (1.575 in)
.455 Webley Auto	Semi-rimmed, straight	11.56 mm (0.455 in)	12.01 mm (0.473 in)	12.04 mm (0.474 in)	12.7 mm (0.50 in)	23.62 mm (0.930 in)	31.24 mm (1.230 in)
.460 Rowland	Rimless, straight	11.48 mm (0.452 in)	12.0 mm (0.47 in)	12.09 mm (0.476 in)	12.09 mm (0.476 in)	24.3 mm (0.96 in)	32.4 mm (1.28 in)
11.35mm Schouboe	Rimless, straight	11.33 mm (0.446 in)	11.96 mm (0.471 in)	12.01 mm (0.473 in)	11.98 mm (0.472 in)	18.12 mm (0.713 in)	28.98 mm (1.141 in)

== Revolver cartridges ==
Name	Case type	Bullet diameter	Neck diameter	Base diameter	Rim diameter	Case length	OAL
11mm French Ordnance	Rimmed, straight	10.8 mm (0.43 in)	11.40 mm (0.449 in)	11.68 mm (0.460 in)	12.47 mm (0.491 in)	18.03 mm (0.710 in)	29.97 mm (1.180 in)
11mm German Service	Rimmed, straight	10.82 mm (0.426 in)	11.40 mm (0.449 in)	11.51 mm (0.453 in)	12.93 mm (0.509 in)	24.38 mm (0.960 in)	30.73 mm (1.210 in)
.44 S&W Special	Rimmed, straight	10.89 mm (0.429 in)	11.61 mm (0.457 in)	11.61 mm (0.457 in)	13.06 mm (0.514 in)	29.46 mm (1.160 in)	41.15 mm (1.620 in)
.44 Remington Magnum	Rimmed, straight	10.89 mm (0.429 in)	11.61 mm (0.457 in)	11.61 mm (0.457 in)	13.06 mm (0.514 in)	32.78 mm (1.291 in)	40.89 mm (1.610 in)
.44 S&W Russian	Rimmed, straight	10.89 mm (0.429 in)	11.61 mm (0.457 in)	11.61 mm (0.457 in)	13.08 mm (0.515 in)	24.64 mm (0.970 in)	36.32 mm (1.430 in)
.44 S&W American	Rimmed, straight	11.02 mm (0.434 in)	11.13 mm (0.438 in)	11.18 mm (0.440 in)	12.85 mm (0.506 in)	23.11 mm (0.910 in)	36.58 mm (1.440 in)
.44 Webley (.442 R.I.C.)	Rimmed, straight	11.07 mm (0.436 in)	11.94 mm (0.470 in)	11.99 mm (0.472 in)	12.78 mm (0.503 in)	17.53 mm (0.690 in)	27.94 mm (1.100 in)
.44 Bulldog	Rimmed, straight	11.18 mm (0.440 in)	11.94 mm (0.470 in)	12.01 mm (0.473 in)	12.78 mm (0.503 in)	14.48 mm (0.570 in)	24.13 mm (0.950 in)
.44 Colt	Rimmed, straight	11.25 mm (0.443 in)	11.43 mm (0.450 in)	11.58 mm (0.456 in)	12.27 mm (0.483 in)	27.94 mm (1.100 in)	38.1 mm (1.50 in)
11.75mm Montenegrin	Rimmed, straight	11.30 mm (0.445 in)	11.99 mm (0.472 in)	12.45 mm (0.490 in)	14.10 mm (0.555 in)	35.56 mm (1.400 in)	43.94 mm (1.730 in)
.45 Webley	Rimmed, straight	11.48 mm (0.452 in)	11.96 mm (0.471 in)	11.96 mm (0.471 in)	12.80 mm (0.504 in)	20.83 mm (0.820 in)	29.21 mm (1.150 in)
.45 Auto Rim	Rimmed, straight	11.48 mm (0.452 in)	11.99 mm (0.472 in)	12.078 mm (0.4755 in)	13.11 mm (0.516 in)	22.81 mm (0.898 in)	32.39 mm (1.275 in)
.454 Magnum	Rimmed, straight	11.53 mm (0.454 in)	12.24 mm (0.482 in)	12.90 mm (0.508 in)	13.51 mm (0.532 in)	50.80 mm (2.000 in)	66.04 mm (2.600 in)
.45 Schofield (.45 Smith & Wesson)	Rimmed, straight	11.48 mm (0.452 in)	12.12 mm (0.477 in)	12.09 mm (0.476 in)	13.26 mm (0.522 in)	28.14 mm (1.108 in)	36.32 mm (1.430 in)
.45 Colt (.45 Long Colt)	Rimmed, straight	11.48 mm (0.452 in)	12.12 mm (0.477 in)	12.19 mm (0.480 in)	13.00 mm (0.512 in)	32.78 mm (1.291 in)	40.64 mm (1.600 in)
.454 Casull	Rimmed, straight	11.48 mm (0.452 in)	12.19 mm (0.480 in)	12.19 mm (0.480 in)	13.00 mm (0.512 in)	34.92 mm (1.375 in)	45.62 mm (1.796 in)
.460 S&W Magnum	Rimmed, straight	11.48 mm (0.452 in)	12.14 mm (0.478 in)	12.14 mm (0.478 in)	13.21 mm (0.520 in)	45.72 mm (1.800 in)	58.17 mm (2.290 in)
.455 Webley (.455 Webley Mk II)	Rimmed, straight	11.53 mm (0.454 in)	12.09 mm (0.476 in)	12.19 mm (0.480 in)	13.59 mm (0.535 in)	19.56 mm (0.770 in)	31.24 mm (1.230 in)
.455 Webley (.455 Colt)	Rimmed, straight	11.56 mm (0.455 in)	12.01 mm (0.473 in)	12.14 mm (0.478 in)	13.46 mm (0.530 in)	22.10 mm (0.870 in)	34.29 mm (1.350 in)
.450 Adams (.450 Boxer Mk I)	Rimmed, straight	11.56 mm (0.455 in)	12.07 mm (0.475 in)	12.12 mm (0.477 in)	12.95 mm (0.510 in)	17.53 mm (0.690 in)	27.94 mm (1.100 in)
.476 Enfield (.476 Eley)	Rimmed, straight	11.56 mm (0.455 in)	12.04 mm (0.474 in)	12.14 mm (0.478 in)	13.46 mm (0.530 in)	22.01 mm (0.867 in)	33.78 mm (1.330 in)

== Rifle cartridges ==
Name	Case type	Bullet diameter	Neck diameter	Shoulder diameter	Base diameter	Rim diameter	Case length	OAL
.44-40 Winchester	Rimmed, straight	10.85 mm (0.427 in)	11.25 mm (0.443 in)	11.6 mm (0.46 in)	11.96 mm (0.471 in)	13.33 mm (0.525 in)	33.27 mm (1.310 in)	39.37 mm (1.550 in)
.444 Marlin	Rimmed, straight	10.9 mm (0.43 in)	11.51 mm (0.453 in)	N/A	11.91 mm (0.469 in)	13.06 mm (0.514 in)	54.91 mm (2.162 in)	65.28 mm (2.570 in)
10.75mm Russian Berdan	Rimmed, bottleneck	10.92 mm (0.430 in)	11.4 mm (0.45 in)	12.85 mm (0.506 in)	14.4 mm (0.57 in)	16.18 mm (0.637 in)	56.9 mm (2.24 in)	74.93 mm (2.950 in)
11mm Murata	Rimmed, bottleneck	10.97 mm (0.432 in)	11.81 mm (0.465 in)	13.36 mm (0.526 in)	13.77 mm (0.542 in)	16.05 mm (0.632 in)	59.94 mm (2.360 in)	79.5 mm (3.13 in)
.425 Westley Richards Magnum	Rebated-rim, bottleneck	11.05 mm (0.435 in)	11.58 mm (0.456 in)	13.72 mm (0.540 in)	13.79 mm (0.543 in)	11.86 mm (0.467 in)	67.06 mm (2.640 in)	83.82 mm (3.300 in)
11.15mm Spanish Remington	Rimmed, bottleneck	11.05 mm (0.435 in)	11.63 mm (0.458 in)	13 mm (0.51 in)	13.11 mm (0.516 in)	16.13 mm (0.635 in)	57.15 mm (2.250 in)	71.63 mm (2.820 in)
11mm Belgian Albini	Rimmed, bottleneck	11.05 mm (0.435 in)	11.99 mm (0.472 in)	13.59 mm (0.535 in)	14.73 mm (0.580 in)	17.22 mm (0.678 in)	50.8 mm (2.00 in)	66.04 mm (2.600 in)
11mm Belgian Comblain	Rimmed, bottleneck	11.07 mm (0.436 in)	11.68 mm (0.460 in)	13.51 mm (0.532 in)	14.61 mm (0.575 in)	17.09 mm (0.673 in)	53.34 mm (2.100 in)	70.1 mm (2.76 in)
11.2×72mm Schüler	Rebated-rim, bottleneck	11.18 mm (0.440 in)	11.81 mm (0.465 in)	12.95 mm (0.510 in)	13.61 mm (0.536 in)	11.91 mm (0.469 in)	71.12 mm (2.800 in)	97.79 mm (3.850 in)
11.2×60mm Schüler (Mauser)	Rebated-rim, bottleneck	11.18 mm (0.440 in)	11.81 mm (0.465 in)	13.00 mm (0.512 in)	13.00 mm (0.512 in)	11.81 mm (0.465 in)	59.69 mm (2.350 in)	72.64 mm (2.860 in)
10.8×47mmR Martini Target	Rimmed, bottleneck	11.20 mm (0.441 in)	11.76 mm (0.463 in)	13.00 mm (0.512 in)	13.11 mm (0.516 in)	15.01 mm (0.591 in)	44.45 mm (1.750 in)	56.64 mm (2.230 in)
11.15x42mmR M/67 and 11x58mmR M/77 Werndl	Rimmed, bottleneck	11.2 mm (0.44 in)	11.84 mm (0.466 in)	13.61 mm (0.536 in)	13.84 mm (0.545 in)	15.67 mm (0.617 in)	57.66 mm (2.270 in)	76.71 mm (3.020 in)
11mm French Gras	Rimmed, bottleneck	11.3 mm (0.44 in)	11.89 mm (0.468 in)	13.49 mm (0.531 in)	13.82 mm (0.544 in)	16.94 mm (0.667 in)	59.44 mm (2.340 in)	76.2 mm (3.00 in)
.44 Henry	Rimmed, straight	11.33 mm (0.446 in)	11.00 mm (0.433 in)	N/A	11.20 mm (0.441 in)	13.20 mm (0.520 in)	22.9 mm (0.90 in)	34.2 mm (1.35 in)
11.15mm Mauser	Rimmed, bottleneck	11.33 mm (0.446 in)	11.81 mm (0.465 in)	12.95 mm (0.510 in)	13.11 mm (0.516 in)	14.88 mm (0.586 in)	60.2 mm (2.37 in)	76.2 mm (3.00 in)
11.43mm Turkish	Rimmed, bottleneck	11.35 mm (0.447 in)	12.04 mm (0.474 in)	14.22 mm (0.560 in)	14.78 mm (0.582 in)	16.97 mm (0.668 in)	58.42 mm (2.300 in)	79.56 mm (3.132 in)
11.43mm Egyptian	Rimmed, bottleneck	11.38 mm (0.448 in)	12.17 mm (0.479 in)	13.77 mm (0.542 in)	14.76 mm (0.581 in)	16.97 mm (0.668 in)	49.28 mm (1.940 in)	69.34 mm (2.730 in)
11.4mm Werndl M/73	Rimmed, straight	11.4 mm (0.45 in)	11.99 mm (0.472 in)	N/A	12.52 mm (0.493 in)	14.5 mm (0.57 in)	50.04 mm (1.970 in)	64.77 mm (2.550 in)
.500/450 Black Powder No.2 Musket	Rimmed, bottleneck	11.46 mm (0.451 in)	12.34 mm (0.486 in)	13.59 mm (0.535 in)	14.63 mm (0.576 in)	16.84 mm (0.663 in)	59.94 mm (2.360 in)	75.95 mm (2.990 in)
11.4mm Brazilian Comblain	Rimmed, bottleneck	11.48 mm (0.452 in)	12.55 mm (0.494 in)	13.46 mm (0.530 in)	14.94 mm (0.588 in)	17.32 mm (0.682 in)	51.31 mm (2.020 in)	66.55 mm (2.620 in)
.450 Bushmaster	Rebated-rim, straight	11.5 mm (0.45 in)	12 mm (0.47 in)	N/A	12.70 mm (0.500 in)	12.01 mm (0.473 in)	43.2 mm (1.70 in)	57.4 mm (2.26 in)
.45 Raptor	Rimless, straight	11.5 mm (0.45 in)	12.1 mm (0.48 in)	N/A	11.96 mm (0.471 in)	12.0 mm (0.47 in)	46 mm (1.8 in)	58 mm (2.3 in)
11.5mm Spanish Reformado	Rimmed, straight	11.53 mm (0.454 in)	12.34 mm (0.486 in)	N/A	13.34 mm (0.525 in)	16.03 mm (0.631 in)	57.4 mm (2.26 in)	77.72 mm (3.060 in)
11.7mm Danish Remington	Rimmed, straight	11.53 mm (0.454 in)	12.34 mm (0.486 in)	N/A	13.06 mm (0.514 in)	14.71 mm (0.579 in)	51.05 mm (2.010 in)	62.23 mm (2.450 in)
.500/450 Magnum Nitro Express	Rimmed, bottleneck	11.56 mm (0.455 in)	12.12 mm (0.477 in)	12.7 mm (0.50 in)	14.48 mm (0.570 in)	16.36 mm (0.644 in)	82.55 mm (3.250 in)	99.18 mm (3.905 in)
.450 No 2 Nitro Express (3 1/2")	Rimmed, bottleneck	11.56 mm (0.455 in)	12.12 mm (0.477 in)	13.16 mm (0.518 in)	11.79 mm (0.464 in)	16.51 mm (0.650 in)	88.9 mm (3.50 in)	108.71 mm (4.280 in)
.577/450 Martini–Henry	Rimmed, bottleneck	11.56 mm (0.455 in)	12.37 mm (0.487 in)	15.95 mm (0.628 in)	16.97 mm (0.668 in)	18.95 mm (0.746 in)	59.44 mm (2.340 in)	79.56 mm (3.132 in)
.45-75 Winchester	Rimmed, bottleneck	11.39 mm (0.448 in)	12.20 mm (0.480 in)	13.87 mm (0.546 in)	14.24 mm (0.561 in)	15.81 mm (0.622 in)	47.86 mm (1.884 in)	56.52 mm (2.225 in)
.45-70 Government	Rimmed, straight	11.63 mm (0.458 in)	12.07 mm (0.475 in)	N/A	12.7 mm (0.50 in)	15.24 mm (0.600 in)	53.34 mm (2.100 in)	68.58 mm (2.700 in)
11mm Beaumont M/71/78	Rimmed, bottleneck	11.63 mm (0.458 in)	12.29 mm (0.484 in)	13.41 mm (0.528 in)	14.63 mm (0.576 in)	16.89 mm (0.665 in)	51.82 mm (2.040 in)	64.52 mm (2.540 in)
.450 Marlin	Belted, straight	11.63 mm (0.458 in)	12.14 mm (0.478 in)	N/A	13.03 mm (0.513 in)	13.51 mm (0.532 in)	53.34 mm (2.100 in)	64.77 mm (2.550 in)
.450 Nitro Express (3 1/4")	Rimmed, straight	11.63 mm (0.458 in)	12.12 mm (0.477 in)	N/A	13.92 mm (0.548 in)	15.9 mm (0.63 in)	82.55 mm (3.250 in)	97.79 mm (3.850 in)
.458 Winchester Magnum	Belted, straight	11.63 mm (0.458 in)	12.14 mm (0.478 in)	N/A	13.03 mm (0.513 in)	13.51 mm (0.532 in)	63.5 mm (2.50 in)	82.55 mm (3.250 in)
.458 SOCOM	Rebated-rim, bottleneck	11.63 mm (0.458 in)	12.32 mm (0.485 in)	13.49 mm (0.531 in)	13.74 mm (0.541 in)	12.01 mm (0.473 in)	40.00 mm (1.575 in)	57.40 mm (2.260 in)
.460 Weatherby Magnum	Belted, bottleneck	11.63 mm (0.458 in)	12.32 mm (0.485 in)	14.22 mm (0.560 in)	14.80 mm (0.583 in)	13.54 mm (0.533 in)	74 mm (2.9 in)	95.25 mm (3.750 in)
.460 Steyr	Rimless, bottleneck	11.63 mm (0.458 in)	12.72 mm (0.501 in)	18.3 mm (0.72 in)	20.4 mm (0.80 in)	20.4 mm (0.80 in)	90 mm (3.5 in)	124.9 mm (4.92 in)
.500/450 No.1 Express	Rimmed, bottleneck	11.63 mm (0.458 in)	12.32 mm (0.485 in)	13.46 mm (0.530 in)	14.66 mm (0.577 in)	16.76 mm (0.660 in)	69.85 mm (2.750 in)	82.55 mm (3.250 in)
.450 Rigby Rimless	Rimless, bottleneck	11.63 mm (0.458 in)	12.38 mm (0.487 in)	14.50 mm (0.571 in)	14.66 mm (0.577 in)	14.99 mm (0.590 in)	73.50 mm (2.894 in)	95.00 mm (3.740 in)
.45-60 Winchester	Rimmed, straight	11.63 mm (0.458 in)	11.94 mm (0.470 in)	N/A	12.7 mm (0.50 in)	15.7 mm (0.62 in)	47.37 mm (1.865 in)	57.15 mm (2.250 in)
11.3mm Beaumont M/71	Rimmed, bottleneck	11.63 mm (0.458 in)	12.34 mm (0.486 in)	13.46 mm (0.530 in)	14.76 mm (0.581 in)	16.92 mm (0.666 in)	50.04 mm (1.970 in)	63.25 mm (2.490 in)
.457 Wild West Guns	Rimmed, straight	11.63 mm (0.458 in)	12.192 mm (0.4800 in)	N/A	12.799 mm (0.5039 in)	15.44 mm (0.608 in)	56.13 mm (2.210 in)	67.69 mm (2.665 in)
.458 Lott	Belted, straight	11.66 mm (0.459 in)	12.22 mm (0.481 in)	N/A	13.023 mm (0.5127 in)	13.51 mm (0.532 in)	71.12 mm (2.800 in)	91.44 mm (3.600 in)
.500/465 Nitro Express	Rimmed, bottleneck	11.84 mm (0.466 in)	12.39 mm (0.488 in)	13.31 mm (0.524 in)	14.55 mm (0.573 in)	16.51 mm (0.650 in)	82.3 mm (3.24 in)	98.04 mm (3.860 in)
.465 H&H Magnum	Belted, bottleneck	11.89 mm (0.468 in)	73.50 mm (2.894 in)	14.71 mm (0.579 in)	15.33 mm (0.604 in)	13.50 mm (0.531 in)	73.50 mm (2.894 in)	90.00 mm (3.543 in)

== See also ==
- .410 bore
