= .442 Webley =

Revolver cartridge

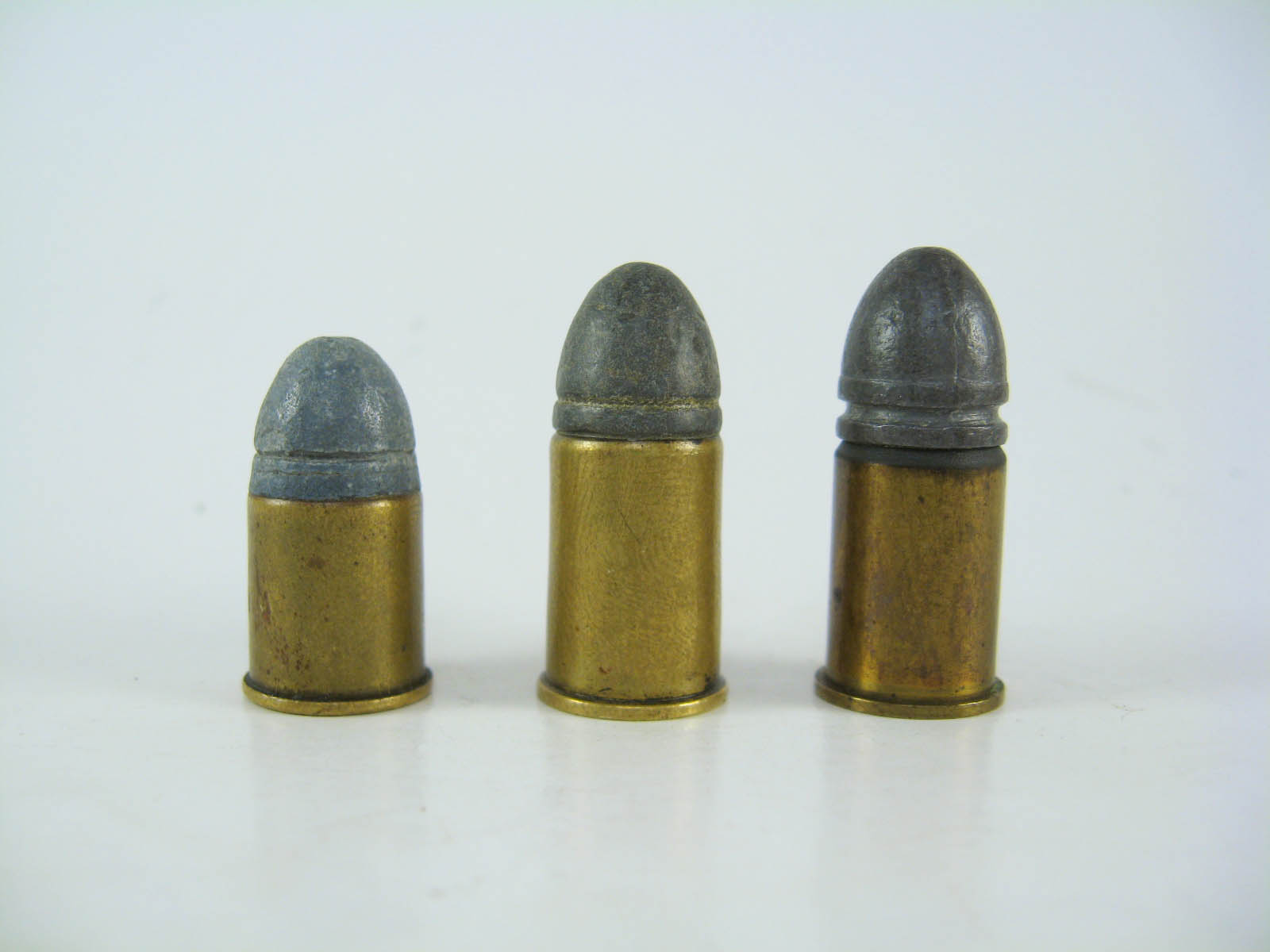
- .44 Bull Dog (Peters), .442 Webley (UMC) and .442 Revolver (Eley)
- Type: Revolver
- Place of origin: British Empire

Production history
- Designed: 1868
- Produced: 1868–1950s

Specifications
- Case type: rimmed, straight
- Bullet diameter: .436 in (11.1 mm)
- Neck diameter: .47 in (12 mm)
- Base diameter: .472 in (12.0 mm)
- Rim diameter: .503 in (12.8 mm)
- Rim thickness: .033 in (0.84 mm)
- Case length: .69 in (18 mm)
- Overall length: 1.1 in (28 mm)
- Rifling twist: 1:20
- Primer type: Large

Ballistic performance
Bullet mass/type	Velocity	Energy
200 gr (13 g) (Kynoch ball, factory load)	700 ft/s (210 m/s)	239 ft⋅lbf (324 J)
200 gr (13 g) (Remington factory load)	715 ft/s (218 m/s)	230 ft⋅lbf (310 J)
- Sources: Barnes & Amber 1972

The .442 Webley (also known as the ".442 Revolver Centre Fire" in Great Britain, the .442 Rook long (kangaroo) in Australia, the "10.5x17mmR" or ".442 Kurz" in Europe, and ".44 Webley" or ".442 R.I.C." in the United States) is a British centrefire revolver cartridge.

== History ==
Introduced in 1868, the .442 (11.2mm) Webley round was used in the Webley RIC revolver. This was the standard service weapon of the Royal Irish Constabulary (RIC, hence the revolver's name), which were also chambered in (among others) .450 Adams and 476/.455. Lt. Col. George Custer is believed to have carried a pair of RIC revolvers (presented to him in 1869 by Lord Berkley Paget) at the Battle of the Little Bighorn.

A black powder round, the .442 originally used a 15–19 grain (gr) (0.972–1.23 g) charge behind a 200–220 gr (13–14.3 g) bullet. This loading was later joined by a smokeless variety.

At one time, the .442 Webley was a popular chambering in self-defence or "pocket" guns (so named for being designed to be carried in a pocket, what today might be a known as a snubnose or carry gun), such as the widely copied Webley British Bulldog pocket revolver.

The cartridge was moderately effective, being roughly similar in power to the contemporary .38 S&W, .41 Colt, or .44 S&W American, and somewhat less potent than the later 7.65mm Parabellum, .38 Special or .45 ACP. It was not very suitable at anything but close range.

Smokeless .442 Webley loads continued to be commercially offered in the U.S. until 1940 and in the United Kingdom and Europe until the 1950s.

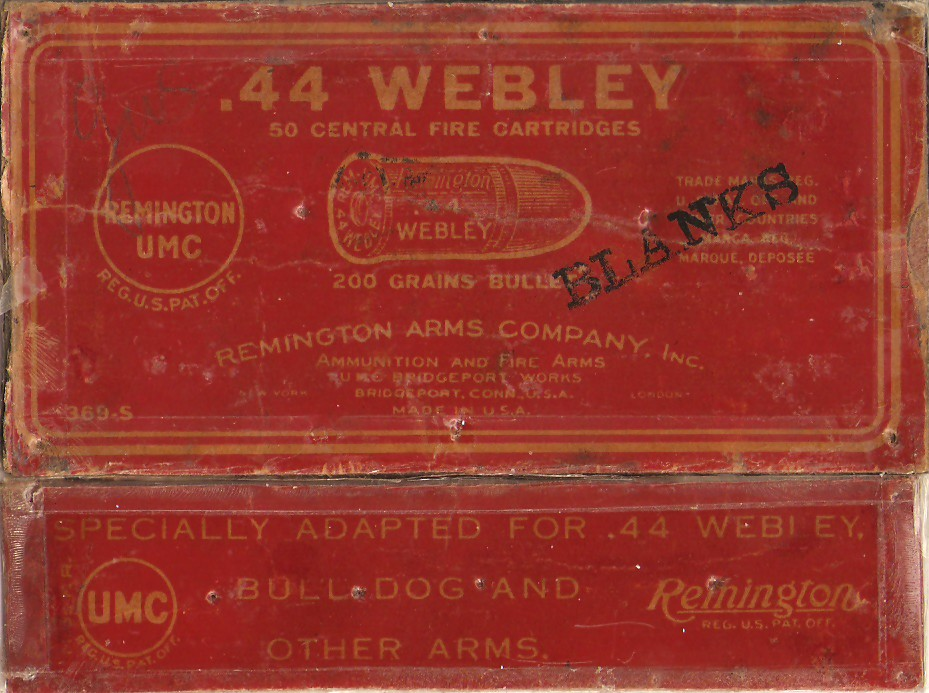
Remington/UMC .442 Webley box labels

== See also ==
- 11mm caliber
- .44 Bull Dog
- List of rimmed cartridges
- List of handgun cartridges

== Sources ==
- Barnes, Frank C., ed. by John T. Amber. ".44 Webley/.44 R.I.C.", in Cartridges of the World, pp. 170 & 177. Northfield, IL: DBI Books, 1972. ISBN 0-695-80326-3.
- ______ and _____. ".30 (7.65mm) Parabellum", in Cartridges of the World, p. 153. Northfield, IL: DBI Books, 1972. ISBN 0-695-80326-3.
- ______ and _____. ".38 Smith & Wesson", in Cartridges of the World, p. 163. Northfield, IL: DBI Books, 1972. ISBN 0-695-80326-3.
- ______ and _____. ".38 Smith & Wesson Special", in Cartridges of the World, p. 163. Northfield, IL: DBI Books, 1972. ISBN 0-695-80326-3.
- ______ and _____. ".41 Long Colt", in Cartridges of the World, p. 165. Northfield, IL: DBI Books, 1972. ISBN 0-695-80326-3.
- ______ and _____. ".44 Smith & Wesson American", in Cartridges of the World, p. 167. Northfield, IL: DBI Books, 1972. ISBN 0-695-80326-3.
- ______ and _____. ".45 Automatic", in Cartridges of the World, p. 171. Northfield, IL: DBI Books, 1972. ISBN 0-695-80326-3.
- Dowell, William Chipchase. The Webley Story. Kirkland, WA: Commonwealth Heritage Foundation, 1987.
- Elman, Robert. Fired in Anger: The Personal Handguns of American Heroes and Villains. Garden City, NY: Doubleday & Company, 1968.
- Ficken, H. R.. Webley's The British Bull Dog Revolver, Serial Numbering and Variations. Retrieved on 2006-08-03.
