= 11.3×36mmR =

Rimmed carbine and revolver cartridge

- Type: Pistol/Carbine
- Place of origin: Austria-Hungary

Service history
- In service: 1867–1900s
- Used by: Austria-Hungary; Montenegro
- Wars: Balkan Wars; World War I

Production history
- Designed: 1867

Specifications
- Parent case: 11.15x36mmR Werndl
- Case type: Rimmed, straight
- Bullet diameter: 11.30 (.445)
- Neck diameter: 11.99 (.472)
- Base diameter: 12.45 (.490)
- Rim diameter: 14.10 (.555)
- Case length: 35.56 (1.40)
- Overall length: 43.94 (1.73)
- Filling: Black powder

The 11.3×36mmR (commonly referred to as "11mm Montenegrin") is a rimmed revolver and carbine cartridge developed by Austria-Hungary. Though originally designed for the Früwirth M1872 Repetiergewehr, it was also used with the Gasser M1870 revolver. The caliber was widespread throughout the Balkans due to the Montenegrin Pattern Revolvers.

Although this cartridge is no longer manufactured, enthusiasts reproduce them using slightly modified 7.62×54mmR brass cut down to the length of the original; using various types of mostly cast bullets.

== See also ==
- 11 mm caliber
- List of rimmed cartridges
- List of handgun cartridges
- Table of handgun and rifle cartridges
