= .450 Adams =

Revolver cartridge

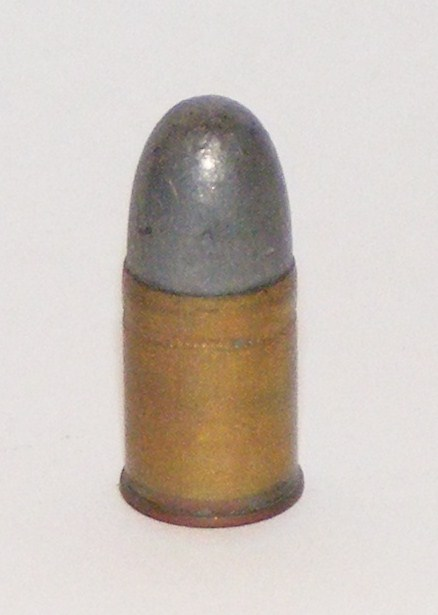
- .450 Adams cartridge
- Type: Revolver
- Place of origin: United Kingdom

Service history
- In service: 1868–1880
- Used by: British military, North-West Mounted Police, colonial military, police forces

Production history
- Designed: 1868

Specifications
- Case type: rimmed straight
- Bullet diameter: .455 in (11.6 mm)
- Neck diameter: .475 in (12.1 mm)
- Base diameter: .477 in (12.1 mm)
- Rim diameter: .510 in (13.0 mm)
- Case length: .69 in (18 mm)
- Overall length: 1.10 in (28 mm)
- Rifling twist: 1:16 in (410 mm)
- Primer type: boxer

Ballistic performance
Bullet mass/type	Velocity	Energy
225 gr (15 g) ball (Kynoch black powder)	650 ft/s (200 m/s)	211 ft⋅lbf (286 J)
225 gr (15 g) ball (Kynoch smokeless powder)	700 ft/s (210 m/s)	245 ft⋅lbf (332 J)
- Sources: Barnes & Amber 1972

The .450 Adams was a British black powder centrefire revolver cartridge, initially used in converted Beaumont–Adams revolvers, in the late 1860s. Officially designated .450 Boxer Mk I, and also known variously as the .450 Revolver, .450 Colt, .450 Short, .450 Corto, and .450 Mark III, and in America as the .45 Webley, it was the British Army's first centrefire revolver round.

== History ==
The .450 was adopted for the Adams revolver in November 1868, and served until it was replaced in service in 1880 by the .476 Enfield (in the Enfield Mark 1 and 2), which was in turn supplanted by the .455 Webley cartridge in 1887.

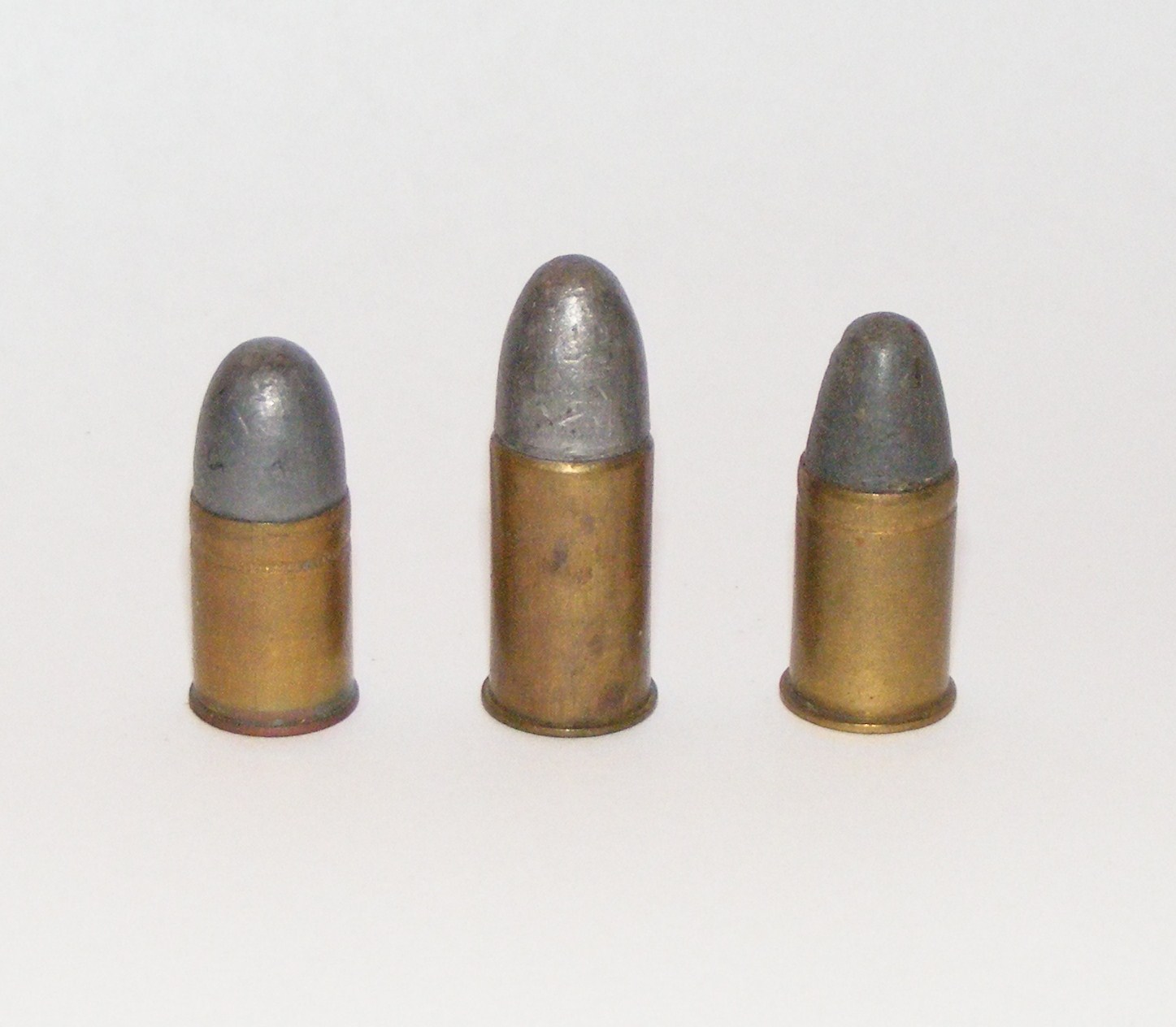
From left to right: .450 Adams, .455 Webley Mk I, .455 Webley Mk II cartridges

Originally loaded with 13 grains (0.84 g) of black powder under a 225-grain (14.6 g) bullet, it was later also offered in a smokeless powder loading. Despite the different designations, the .450 may be fired in any weapon chambered for .455 Webley, .455 Colt, or .476 Enfield.

While not considered a suitable military round, the .450 Mark III cartridges did serve in reserve for the British armed forces as late as the First World War. The .450 Adams also proved popular among civilian users of Webley RIC and British Bulldog revolvers, being loaded in Europe, and persisting in the United States until around 1940. Both Colt and Smith & Wesson offered revolvers in .450 Adams.

It was roughly similar in power to the contemporary .38 S&W, .41 Colt, and .44 S&W American.

Handloaded ammunition can be made from shortened .455 Webley brass.

== Dimensions ==
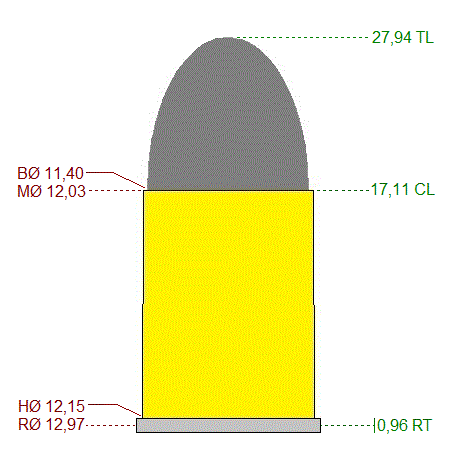
Adams Mk I.

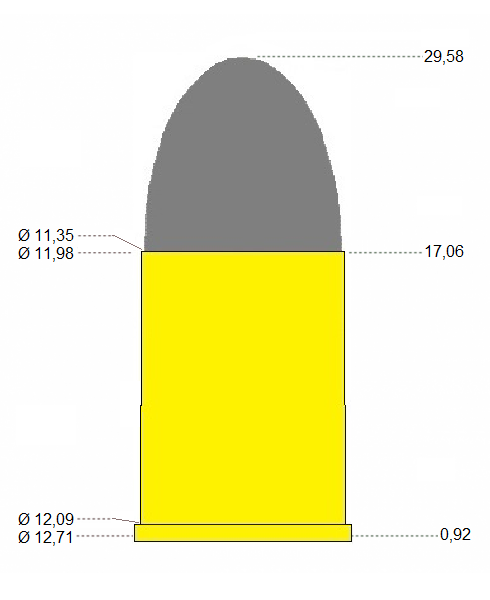
Adams Mk II.

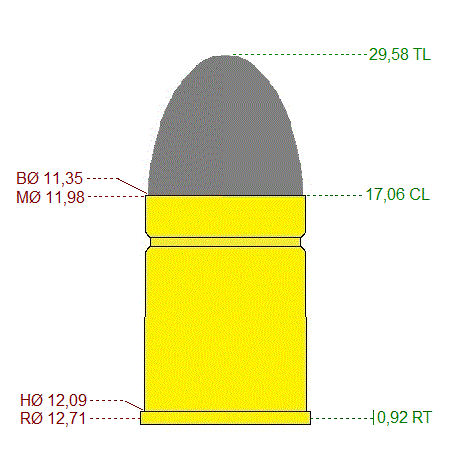
Adams Mk III.

== See also ==
- Table of handgun and rifle cartridges

== Sources ==
- Barnes, Frank C., ed. by John T. Amber. ".450 Revolver", in Cartridges of the World, pp. 170 & 177. Northfield, IL: DBI Books, 1972. ISBN 0-695-80326-3.
- Barnes, Frank C., ed. by John T. Amber. ".38 Smith & Wesson", in Cartridges of the World, p. 163. Northfield, IL: DBI Books, 1972. ISBN 0-695-80326-3.
- Barnes, Frank C., ed. by John T. Amber.. ".41 Long Colt", in Cartridges of the World, p. 165. Northfield, IL: DBI Books, 1972. ISBN 0-695-80326-3.
- Barnes, Frank C., ed. by John T. Amber. ".44 Smith & Wesson American", in Cartridges of the World, p. 167. Northfield, IL: DBI Books, 1972. ISBN 0-695-80326-3.
- Barnes, Frank C., ed. by John T. Amber.. ".455 Revolver MK-1/.455 Colt", in Cartridges of the World, p. 174. Northfield, IL: DBI Books, 1972. ISBN 0-695-80326-3.
- Maze, Robert J. Howdah to High Power. Tucson, AZ: Excalibur Publications, 2002. ISBN 1-880677-17-2.
