= Black Hills Ammunition =

American ammunition and reloading supplies manufacturing company

- Company type: Private
- Founded: 1981; 45 years ago
- Founder: Jeff and Kristi Hoffman
- Headquarters: South Dakota, United States, Rapid City
- Products: Ammunition, reloading supplies and Apparel
- Website: www.black-hills.com

Black Hills Ammunition is an American ammunition and reloading supplies manufacturing company based in Rapid City, South Dakota.

== Description ==
Black Hills is popular among Cowboy Action Shooters (see SASS, the Single Action Shooting Society) because they produce ammunition in a number of obsolete calibers, such as .44 Russian, .38 Long Colt, .44-40 and others.

The exclusive distributor for Black Hills Ammunition in the United Kingdom is Edgar Brothers.
