= British Bull Dog revolver =

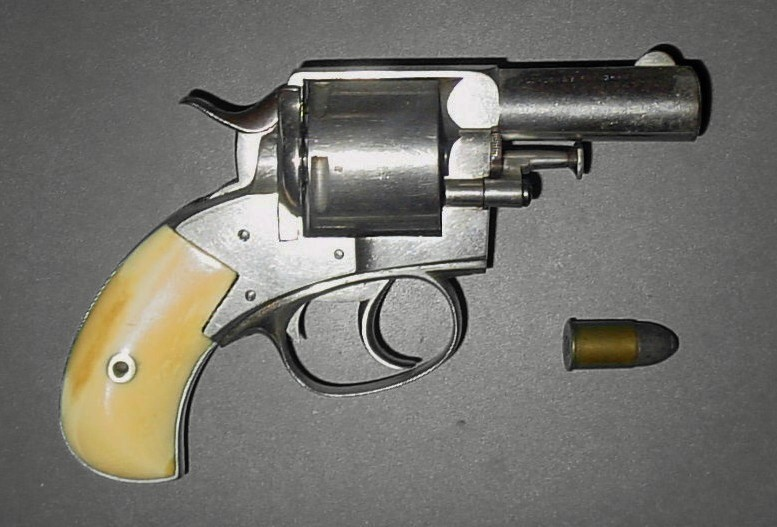
- Webley .450 "British Bull Dog" model - 1870s
- Type: Pocket revolver
- Place of origin: United Kingdom

Production history
- Designer: Philip Webley & Son
- Designed: 1872
- Manufacturer: Webley and various manufacturers in Europe & US
- Produced: 1872–1900s

Specifications
- Barrel length: 2.5 in (64 mm)
- Cartridge: .442 Webley, .450 Adams, .44 Bull Dog
- Action: Double action revolver
- Effective firing range: 15 yd (14 m)
- Maximum firing range: 20 yd (18 m)
- Feed system: 5-round cylinder
- Sights: Fixed front post and rear notch

The British Bull Dog was a type of solid-frame pocket revolver introduced by Philip Webley & Son of Birmingham, England, in 1872, and subsequently copied by gunmakers in continental Europe and the United States.

== History ==
The design of the British Bull Dog revolver had existed since 1868, but Henry Webley registered the trademark in 1878.

From then on, the term has come to mean any short-barrelled double-action revolver with a swing-out ejector rod and a short grip.

Intended to be carried in a coat pocket, many have survived to the present day in good condition, having seen little actual use.

The design originated in 1868 for the Webley Royal Irish Constabulary model revolver and was manufactured as late as 1917.

== Design ==
The Bull Dog featured a 2.5-inch (64 mm) barrel and was chambered for .442 Webley or .450 Adams cartridges, with a five-round cylinder.

Webley produced smaller scaled .320 Revolver and .380 calibre versions later, but did not mark them with the British Bull Dog name.

== Variants ==
Numerous copies and variants of this design (authorized and unauthorized) were made in Belfast, Belgium, Germany, Spain, France and the United States during the late 19th century.

A version made by Webley, but finished by Belfast-based gunmaker, Joseph Braddell, known as the Ulster Bull Dog, used a longer grip frame than the standard, making the revolver easier to control and shoot.

American copies were manufactured by the firms of Forehand & Wadsworth, Iver Johnson and Harrington & Richardson.

Belgian and American versions (aka: Frontier Bulldogs) were chambered for the .44 S&W American or .442 Webley cartridges.

The .44 Bull Dog was a popular American cartridge that was a shorter and less powerful cartridge that could also be fired from .442 Webley caliber revolvers.

In 1973, Charter Arms introduced their Bulldog revolver. It is a five shot snub nose that is designed for concealed carry or a backup gun. It was named in honour of the original but does not share a design.

== Service ==
US Army general, George Armstrong Custer, was said to have carried a pair at the Battle of the Little Bighorn.

British Bull Dog revolvers were issued to employees of the Southern Pacific Railroad Company until 1895.

The British Bulldog was still less popular among civilians during the conquest of the American West in the nineteenth century than more famous revolvers made by Colt's Manufacturing Company or Smith & Wesson.

== Notable assassinations ==
=== James A. Garfield ===
Charles J. Guiteau used a .442 Webley British Bulldog revolver to assassinate United States President James A. Garfield at the Baltimore and Potomac Railroad Station in Washington, D.C., on 2 July 1881. Guiteau was a disgruntled lawyer who was angry that Garfield had not appointed him to a federal post.

Guiteau reportedly wanted a British Bulldog revolver with ivory grips instead of wooden ones, as he believed they would look nicer when the gun was displayed in a museum, but decided not to spend the extra US$1 (equal to $33.36 today) that the ivory-gripped model would have cost. Though he could not afford the extra dollar, the store owner dropped the price for him.

In all, he paid $10 for the revolver, a box of cartridges, and a penknife, before spending the next day familiarising himself with the revolver's operation and firing 10 practice shots with it into trees along the banks of the Potomac River. He used the revolver to shoot Garfield a week or so later in the Sixth Street Railway Station in Washington, D.C. After Guiteau's trial, the revolver was placed in the Smithsonian Institution but disappeared sometime later.

=== Cánovas del Castillo ===
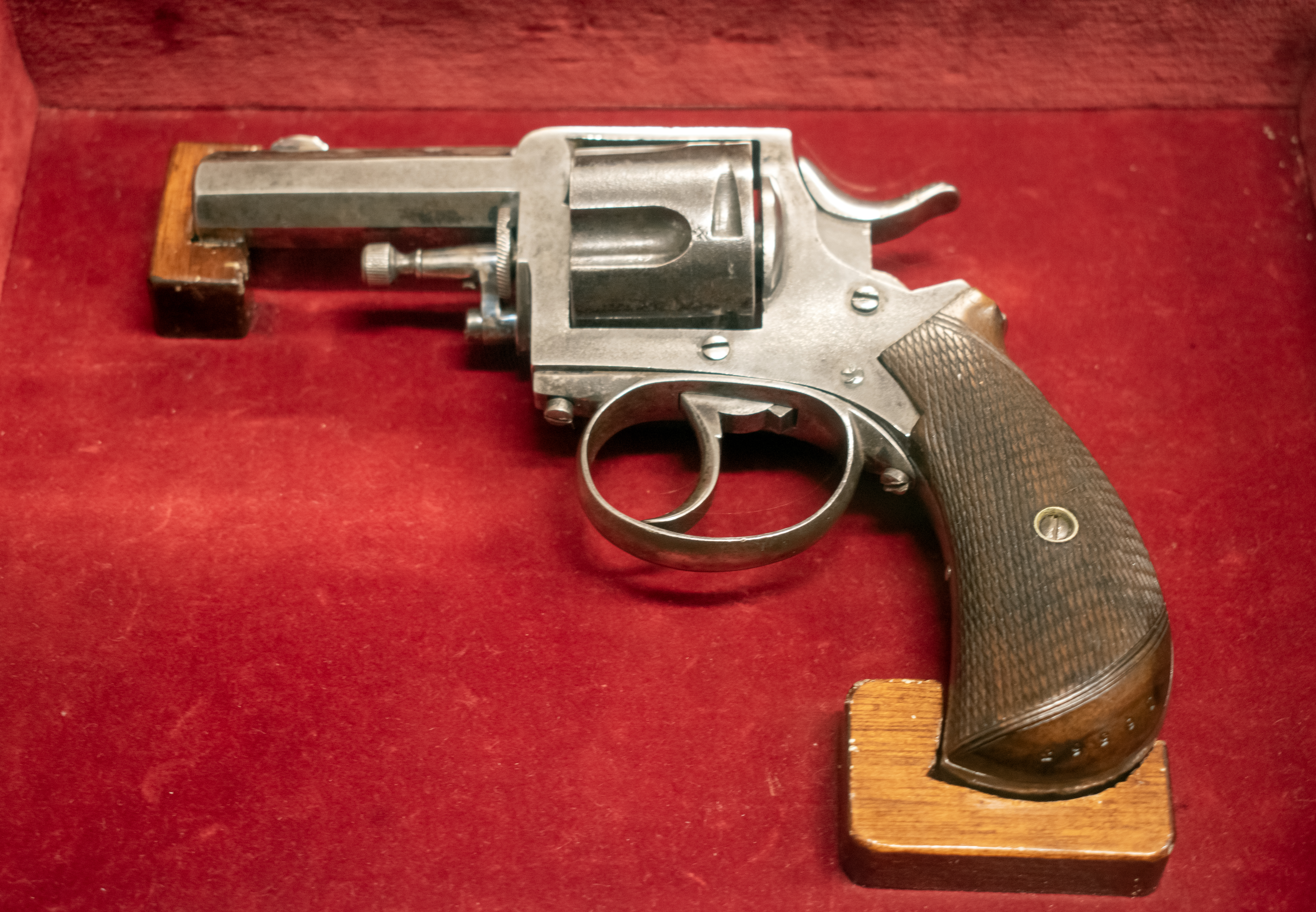
The gun used by Michelle Angiolillo to assassinate Antonio Cánovas del Castillo.

The Spanish prime minister Antonio Cánovas del Castillo was assassinated by the Italian anarchist Michele Angiolillo in Arrasate, Basque Country using a British Bull Dog revolver. He was trying to vindicate the repression against anarchists after the 1896 Barcelona Corpus Christi procession bombing.

== Gallery ==
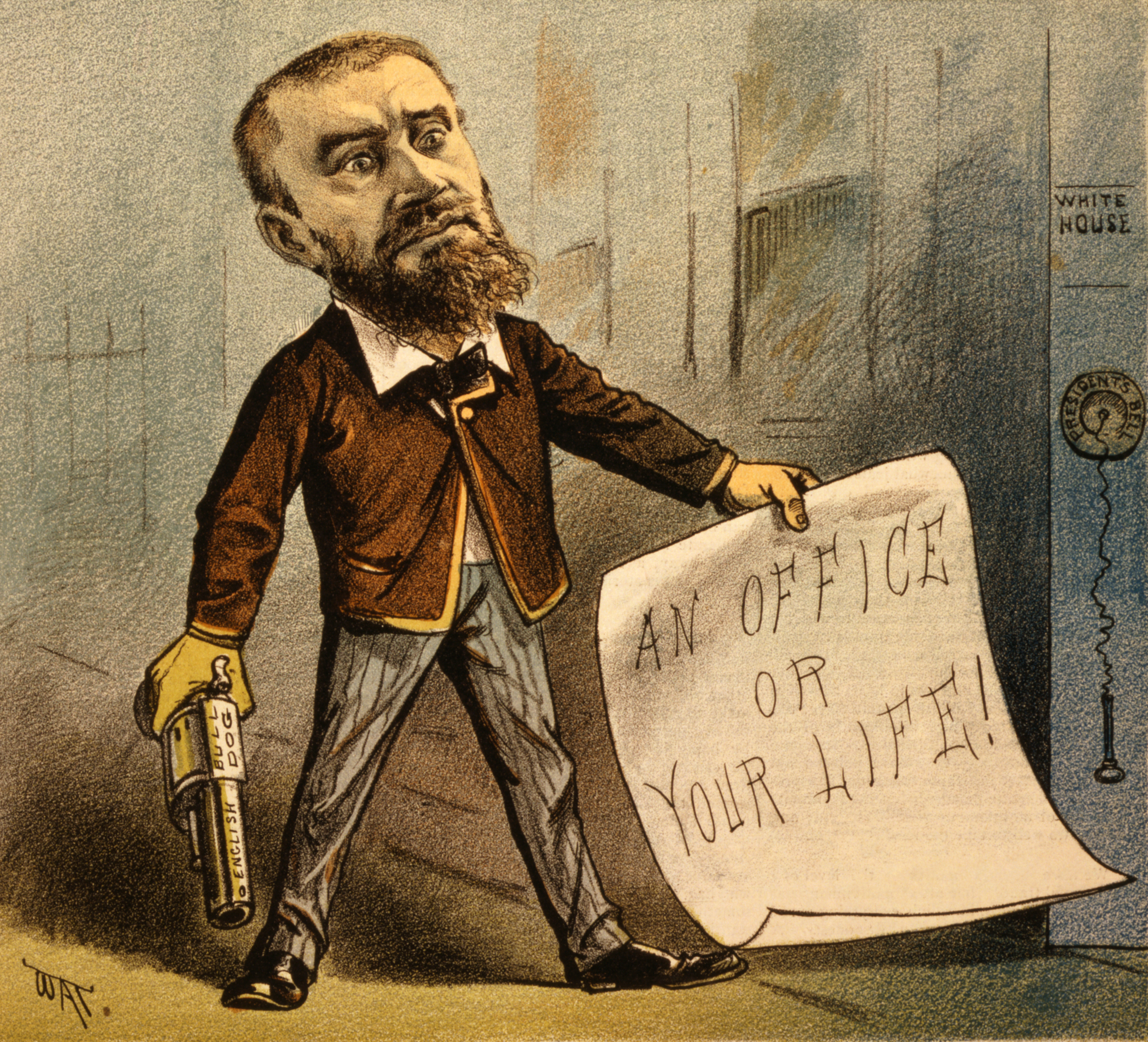
1881 cartoon of presidential assassin Charles Guiteau holding his Bulldog revolver

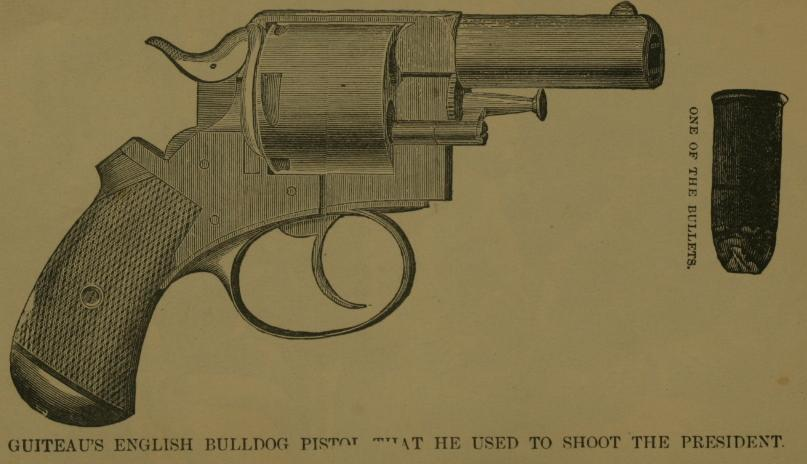
1881 sketch of Guiteau Bulldog pistol

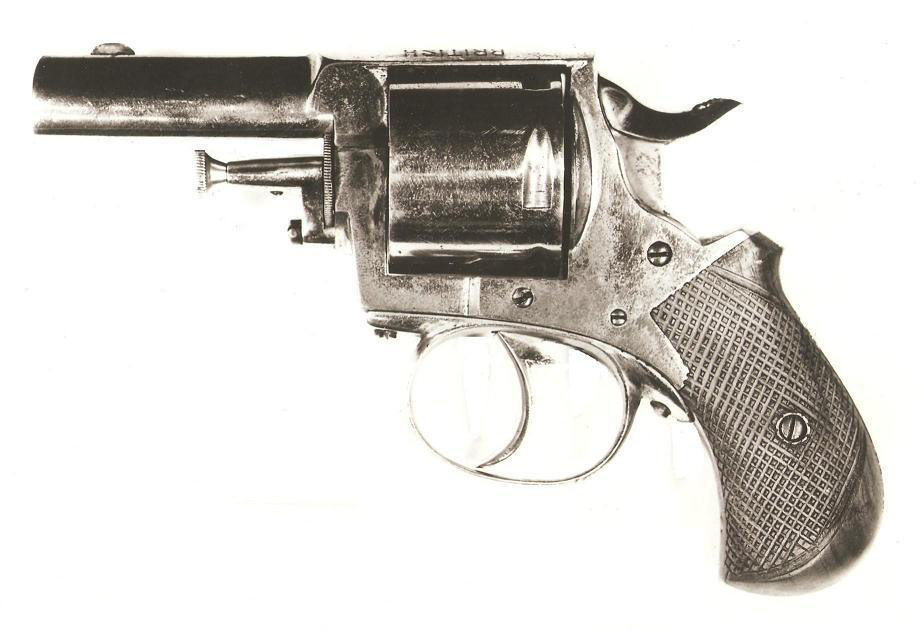
Smithsonian file photograph of the British Bulldog revolver used by Charles Guiteau to assassinate President James Garfield in 1881

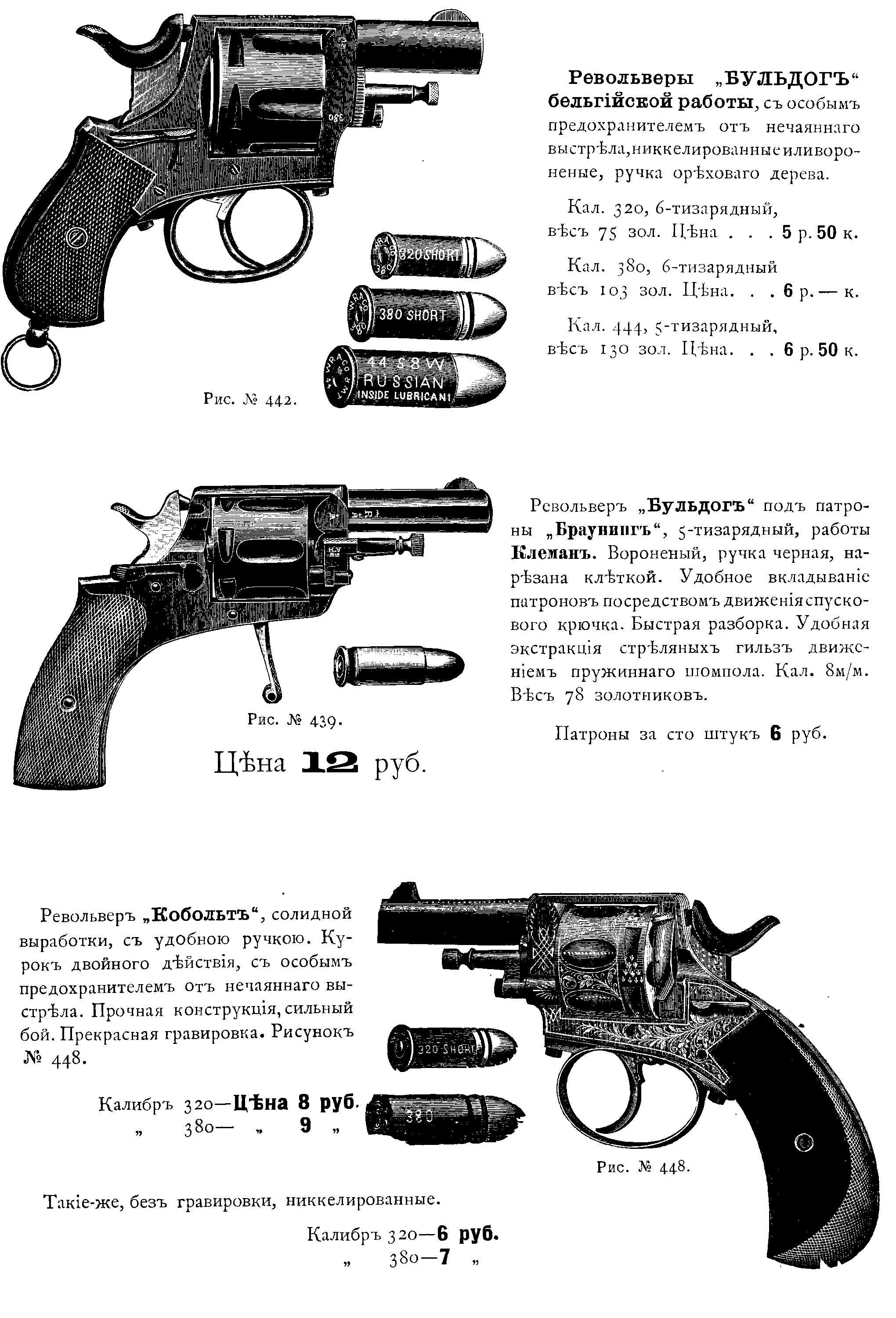
Belgian clones of British Bulldog, late 1880s

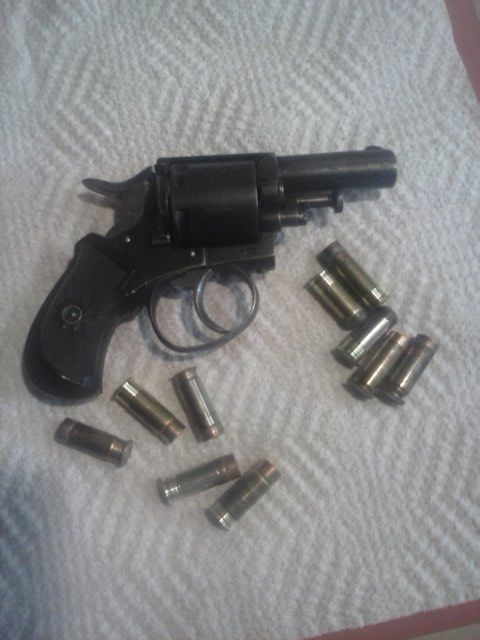
Belgian proofed .44 caliber Bulldog 140 year old revolver with newly made ammunition

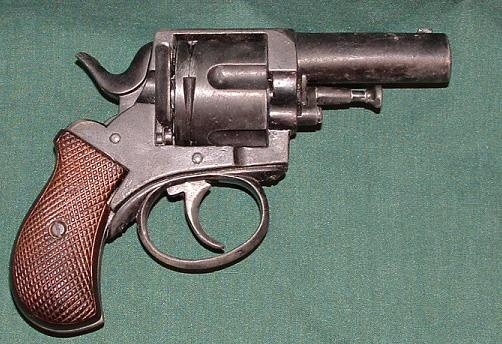
Non-firing replica of a British Bulldog, manufactured by Denix of Spain
