= Gasser M1870 =

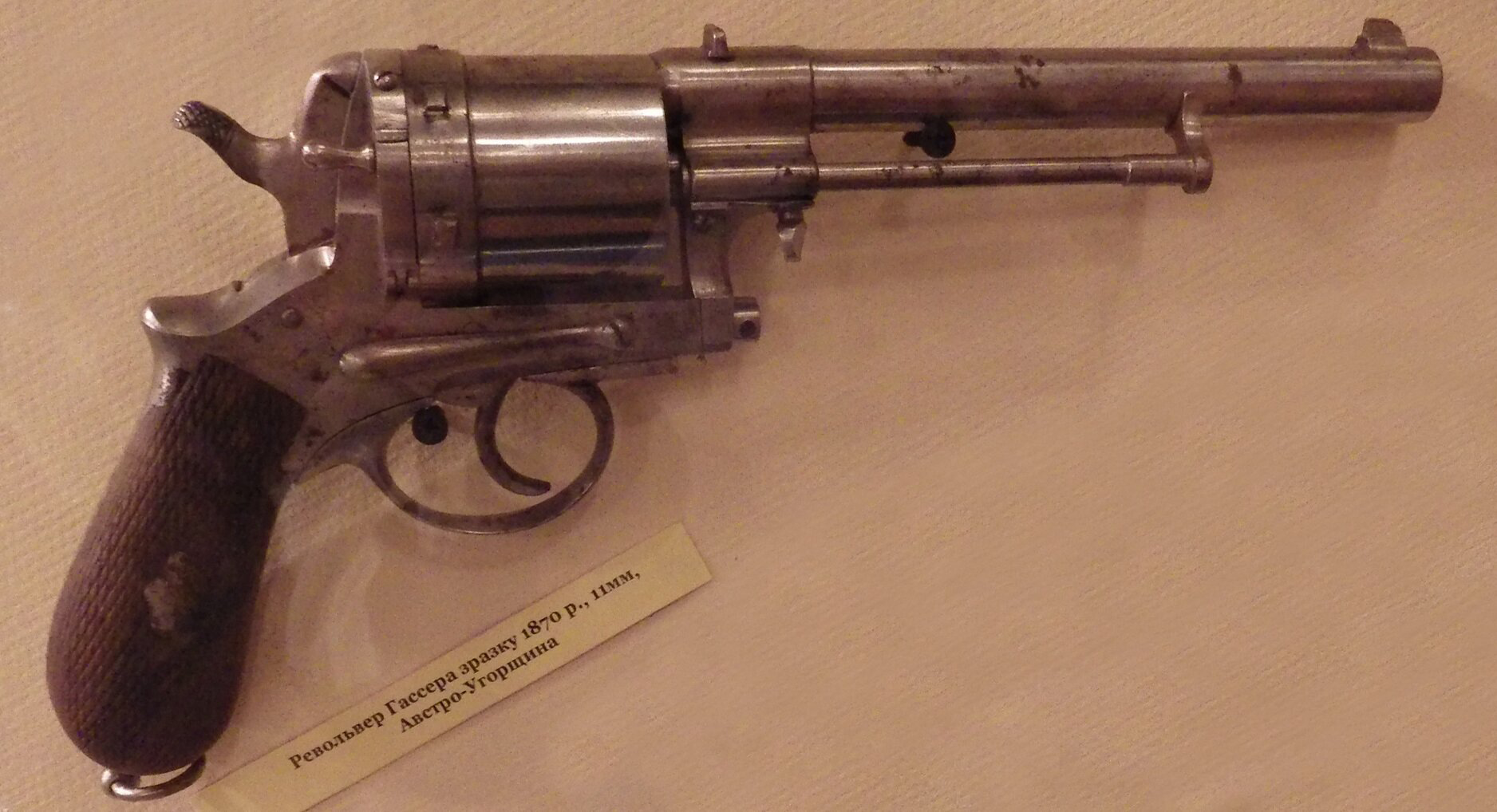
- A Gasser M1870 revolver displayed at the National Museum of Military History of Ukraine in Kyiv, Ukraine
- Type: Revolver
- Place of origin: Austria-Hungary

Service history
- In service: 1870–1918
- Used by: Austria-Hungary
- Wars: Boxer Rebellion; World War I (limited use)

Production history
- Designer: Leopold Gasser
- Designed: 1870
- Manufacturer: Leopold Gasser Waffenfabrik
- Produced: 1870–1919
- Variants: Long- and short-barrel versions

Specifications (Long-barrel version)
- Mass: 1.3 kg (2.9 lb)
- Length: 375 mm (14.8 in)
- Barrel length: 235 mm (9.3 in)
- Cartridge: 11.3×36mmR
- Action: Single-action
- Muzzle velocity: 326 m/s (1,070 ft/s)
- Feed system: 6-round cylinder
- Sights: Iron sights

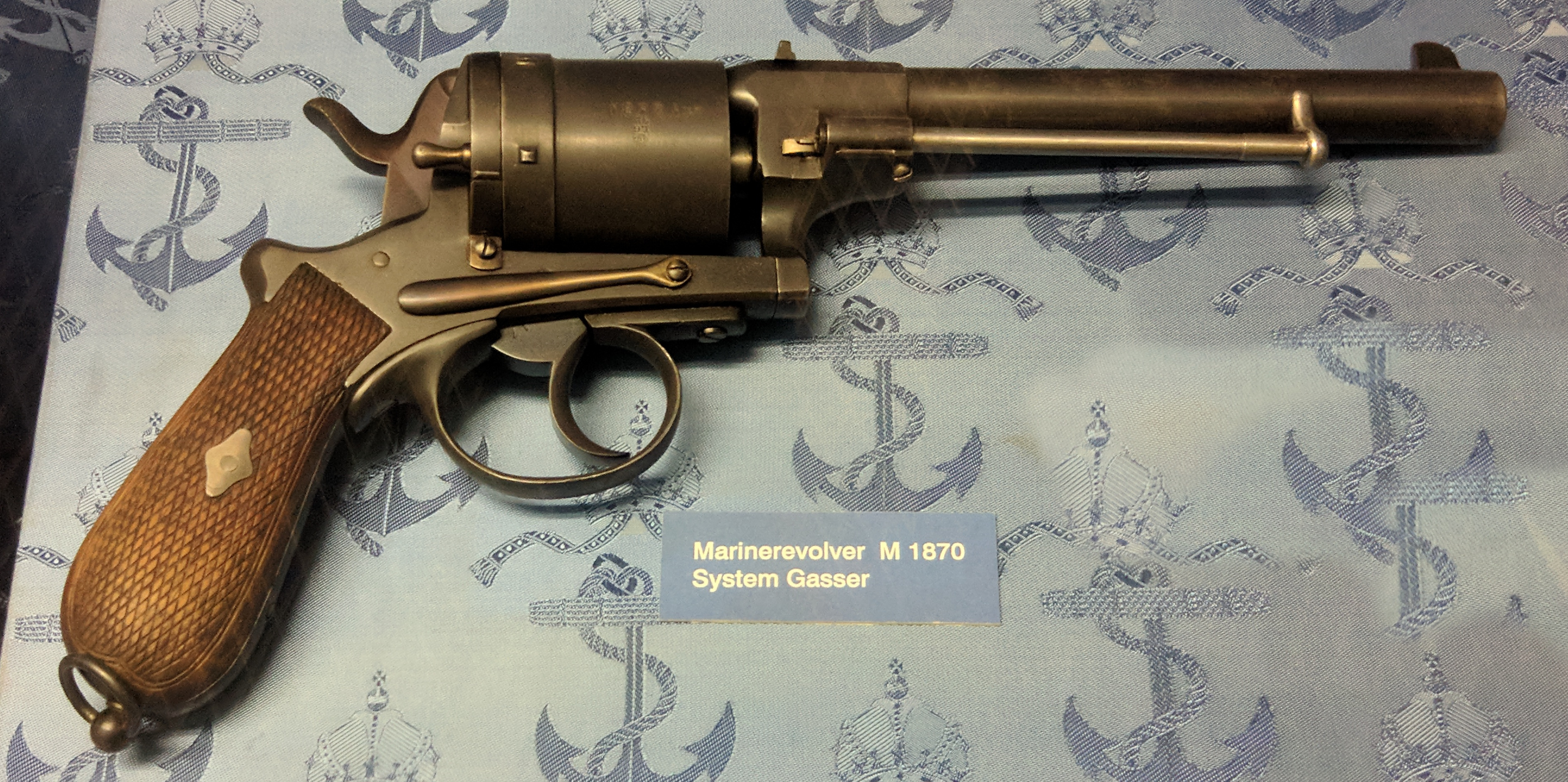
A Gasser M1870 naval-variant revolver displayed at the Museum of Military History in Vienna, Austria.

The Gasser M1870 was an Austro-Hungarian revolver chambered for the 11.3×36mmR cartridge. It was adopted by the Austro-Hungarian Army cavalry in 1870 and became the standard cavalry revolver of the Austro-Hungarian military.

The M1870 was an open-frame design in which the barrel assembly was secured to the frame by a screw beneath the cylinder arbor. The revolver featured a right-side loading gate, a rod ejector beneath the barrel, and a distinctive safety mechanism incorporated into the right side of the frame. Its long centerfire cartridge was related to ammunition previously used in Fruwirth carbines.

The Gasser M1870 was produced in several configurations, including naval and other variants. Its design formed the basis for later Gasser revolvers developed for military and civilian use in the Austro-Hungarian. The M1870 remained an important military revolver design during the late nineteenth century before being superseded by newer models.

== Gasser-Kropatschek M1876 ==
The Gasser-Kropatschek M1876 was adopted by Austria Hungary in 1876 as a refinement of the 1870 Gasser design. Instigated by Alfred Kropatschek, the changes being principally a matter of reducing weight by reducing the caliber to 9mm.

== Montenegrin "Gasser Pattern" revolvers ==
=== Specification ===
The title 'Montenegrin Gasser' covers a variety of six-chamber large calibre revolvers. The standard issue in the Montenegrin military was the Austrian Gasser Model 1870 in 11.2mm which became known as the Montenegrin Gasser. Montenegrin revolvers originally appeared as open-frame models, similar to the Austrian Gasser M1870 and usually in 11mm nominal (11.3mm actual) calibers. Single and double-action locks were used, grips were often in ivory or bone, engraving and gold inlay work was common, and the predominant impression was one of weight and bulk. Later Montenegrin revolvers offered hinged-frame construction, with Galand cylinder locks and a self-extracting mechanism. Most are marked 'Guss Stahl' (crucible cast steel frame), 'Kaiser's Patent' and similar phrases.

=== Mandatory ownership ===
In 1910 King Nicholas I of Montenegro proclaimed that all male citizens were members of a national militia and had both a right and a duty to own at least one Gasser Pattern revolver under penalty of law.

The official reason for the King's decree was to create an armed populace that would deter neighbouring countries from attacking Montenegro, which was unable to field a large army. However, it was widely believed in Montenegro that this decision was actually taken because the King owned shares in Leopold Gasser Waffenfabrik in Vienna - the patent holder and sole manufacturer of the pistol at that time. Despite this, the decree actually obliged Montenegrin adult males to own a Gasser Pattern revolver, not necessarily one made by Gasser itself. In fact Leopold Gasser was faced with such heavy demand for the pistol internationally, that it could not fulfil all of the orders placed for it. This led the revolver's manufacturer to license out production to other companies and many Gasser Pattern pistols were then manufactured and sold by other European firms, most notably based out of Belgium and Spain. Even these licensed models did not satiate demand for the pistol and this, alongside a lax enforcement of intellectual property rights in Montenegro, led to many unlicensed local models of the pistol also being produced, with quality ranging from very good to outright dangerous to its user.

Subsequently, the weapon quickly became a status symbol for Montenegrin men and was commonly worn alongside traditional attire. Many Montenegrin immigrants that travelled to North America brought their Gasser pattern revolvers with them and at least two batches of several thousand pistols were smuggled into Mexico during the Mexican Revolution from 1910–1920, leading to the Gasser revolver becoming widespread in the Americas. However, as the original reason for their mass production and the generation that grew around it faded, the pistol eventually lost its place as a status symbol and many were either given away or sold in the secondhand market.

== Later Gasser models ==
Genuine Austrian Gasser products are marked 'L. GASSER PATENT WIEN' or 'L. GASSER OTTAKRING PATENT', and often carry the Gasser trademark of a heart pierced by an arrow. Gasser also produced revolvers for the commercial market. The Gasser-Kropatschek, for example, appeared with fluted cylinders instead of the smooth-surfaced military pattern. He also produced the 9mm 'Post & Police' solid frame non-ejecting double-action revolver, with a hexagonal barrel. A commercial version of this gun was also made, generally offering better finish. There was also a commercial version of the open-frame M1874 in 9mm, and a 9mm hinged frame self-extracting model with the Galand double-action lock.
