= .476 Enfield =

Black powder revolver cartridge

.476 Enfield Mark III
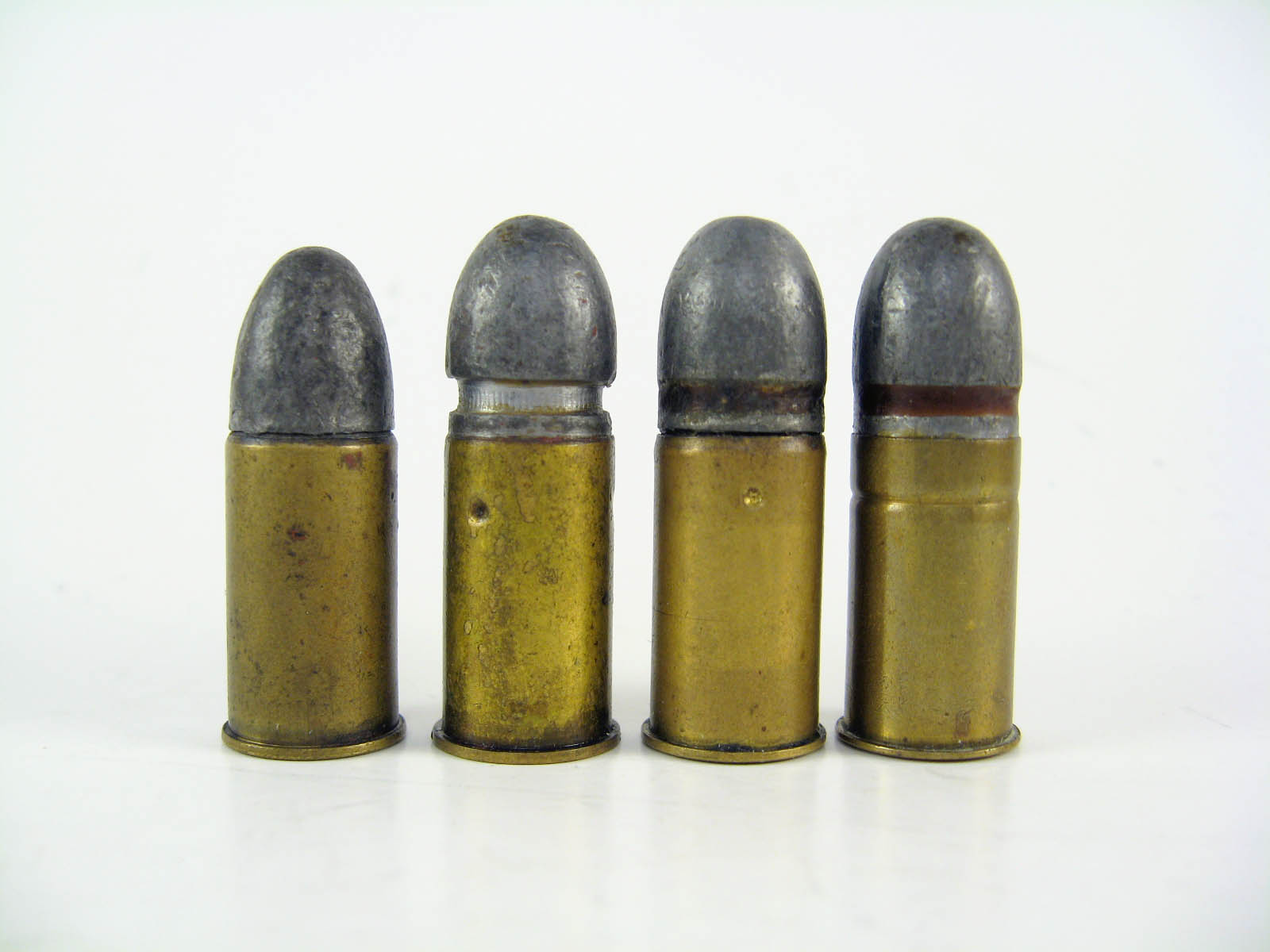
- One Enfield Mk II (left) and three Enfield Mk III cartridges
- Type: Revolver
- Place of origin: United Kingdom

Service history
- In service: 1881–1911
- Used by: British Army, colonial militaries, North-West Mounted Police

Specifications
- Case type: rimmed straight
- Bullet diameter: .455 in (11.6 mm)
- Neck diameter: .474 in (12.0 mm)
- Base diameter: .478 in (12.1 mm)
- Rim diameter: .530 in (13.5 mm)
- Case length: 0.87 in (22 mm)
- Overall length: 1.33 in (34 mm)
- Primer type: Berdan

The .476 Enfield, also known as the .476 Eley, .476 Revolver, and occasionally .455/476, is a British centrefire black powder revolver cartridge. The Enfield name derives from the location of the Royal Small Arms Factory at Enfield Lock, the armoury where British military small arms were produced, while Eley was a British commercial brand. Used in the Enfield Mk II revolver, the Mk III variant was introduced by the British Army in 1881, supplanting the earlier .476 Enfield Mark I and II cartridges, which in turn had replaced the .450 Adams cartridges, all of which also used black powder propellant.

== History ==
=== British service use ===
The .476 Enfield cartridge was only in British service for a comparatively short period before it was replaced by the black powder-loaded .455 Webley Mark I in 1887 and then by the smokeless powder-loaded .455 Webley Mark II in September 1897. Just over 1,000 Enfield Mark IIs were issued to the North-West Mounted Police, and these remained in service until 1911, when the last Enfields were phased out in favour of more modern (and reliable) .45 Colt New Service revolvers.

=== Interchangeability ===
Using the same bullet as the .455 (11.6mm) Webley Mark I, the .476 casing is 0.05 mm (0.002 in) longer and carries a charge of 18 gr (1.17 g) of black powder, compared to 6.5 gr (0.42 g) of cordite in the .455 Mark I. While the .476 Enfield cartridge could be used in any British-manufactured .455 Webley calibre service revolver, there were issues with the later-production Colt or Smith & Wesson .455 Revolver models, which were liable to have slightly smaller bore diameters.

Despite the difference in designation, the .476 readily interchanged with the earlier .450 Adams and .455 Webley rounds (the latter in black powder Mark I and smokeless Marks II through VI), as well as the .455 Colt (a U.S. commercial brand for the same .455 Webley round, with slightly different ballistics), which all use the same .455 in (11.6mm) bullet, the distinction being which diameter was measured. Officially, .450 Adams, .476 Enfield, and .455 Webley cartridges can all be fired in the Webley Mark III British Government Model revolver; although case length, bullet weight and shape, and powder charge differ, all three cartridges feature a case diameter of .476 inch with a bullet diameter of .455 inch, which can be fired in a barrel of .450 inch bore.

== See also ==
- 11mm caliber
- List of cartridges by caliber
- List of handgun cartridges
- List of rifle cartridges
- List of rimmed cartridges
