= Enfield revolver =

Enfield Mk II Revolver
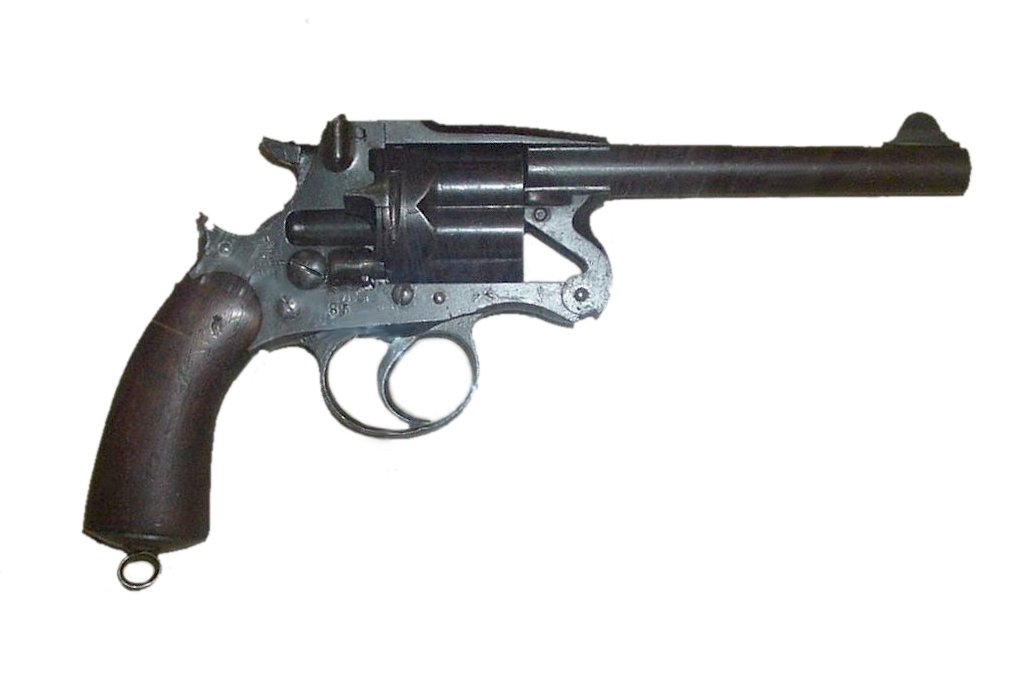
- Type: Service revolver
- Place of origin: United Kingdom

Service history
- In service: 1880–1911
- Used by: United Kingdom & Colonies
- Wars: First Boer War; North-West Rebellion; Second Boer War; Boxer Rebellion; First World War

Production history
- Designer: RSAF Enfield
- Designed: 1879
- Manufacturer: RSAF Enfield
- Produced: 1880 – 1889

Specifications
- Length: 11.5 in (292 mm)
- Barrel length: 5.75 in (146 mm)
- Cartridge: .476" Revolver Mk II
- Calibre: .476 Enfield
- Action: Double-action revolver
- Rate of fire: 18 rounds/minute
- Muzzle velocity: 600 ft/s
- Effective firing range: 25 yd (22 m)
- Maximum firing range: 200 yd
- Feed system: 6-round cylinder
- Sights: fixed front post and rear notch

The Enfield Revolver was a self-extracting British handgun designed and manufactured at the government-owned Royal Small Arms Factory in Enfield, initially in the .476 calibre (actually 11.6 mm).

The .476 calibre Enfield Mk I and Mk II revolvers were the official sidearm of both the British Army and the North-West Mounted Police, as well as being issued to many other Colonial units throughout the British Empire. The term "Enfield Revolver" is not applied to Webley Mk VI revolvers built by RSAF Enfield between 1923 and 1926.

The Enfield No. 2 is an unrelated .38 calibre revolver that was the standard sidearm of British and Empire forces during World War II.

== Enfield Mk I and Mk II Revolvers ==
The first models of Enfield revolver were the .422-calibre Mark I (c.1880) and the .476-calibre Mark II (c.1882). They were the official British military sidearms from 1880 to 1887.

The .476 Enfield cartridge for which the Enfield Mk I/Mk II was chambered fired a 265 gr (17.2 g) lead bullet, and was loaded with 18 gr (1.2 g) of black powder. The cartridge was found to be underpowered, however, during the Afghan War and other contemporary Colonial conflicts, as it lacked the stopping power believed necessary for military use at the time.

Unlike most other self-extracting revolvers (such as the Webley service revolvers or the Smith & Wesson No. 3 Revolver), the Enfield Mk I/Mk II was complicated to unload, having an Owen Jones selective extraction/ejection system which was supposed to allow the firer to eject spent cartridges, whilst retaining live rounds in the cylinder. The Enfield Mk I/Mk II had a hinged frame, and when the barrel was unlatched, the cylinder would move forward, operating the extraction system and allowing the spent cartridges to simply fall out. The idea was that the cylinder moved forward far enough to permit fired cases to be completely extracted (and ejected by gravity), but not far enough to permit live cartridges (i.e., those with projectiles still present, and thus longer in overall length) from being removed in the same manner.

The system was obsolete as soon as the Enfield Mk I was introduced, especially as it required reloading one round at a time via a gate in the side (much like the Colt Single Action Army or the Nagant M1895 revolvers). Combined with the cumbersome nature of the revolver, and a tendency for the action to foul or jam when extracting cartridges, the Enfield Mk I/Mk II revolvers were never popular and eventually replaced in 1889 by the .455 calibre Webley Mk I revolver.

== Service ==
=== Canada: North-West Mounted Police Service ===
The Enfield Mk. II was the issue sidearm of the North-West Mounted Police in Canada from 1883 until 1911. NWMP Commissioner Acheson G. Irvine ordered 200 Mark IIs in 1882, priced at C$15.75 each, which were shipped by London's Montgomery and Workman in November that year, arriving in December. They replaced the Adams.

Irvine liked them so much that, in one of his final acts as Commissioner, he ordered another 600, which were delivered in September 1885. His replacement, Lawrence W. Herchmer, reported the force was entirely outfitted with Enfields (in all 1,079 were provided) and was pleased with them, but concerned about the .476 round being too potent.

The first batch was stamped NWMP-CANADA (issue number between) after delivery; later purchases were not. They were top-break single- or double-action, and fitted with lanyard rings. Worn spindle arms would fail to hold empty cases on ejection, and worn pivot pins could cause barrels to become loose, resulting in inaccuracy. Its deep rifling would allow firing of slugs of between .449 and .476 in (11.4 and 12.1 mm) diameter. Complaints began arising as early as 1887, influenced in part by the British switching to Webleys, and by 1896, hinge wear and barrel loosening were a real issue.

Beginning in late 1904, the Mark II began to be phased out in favor of the .45 calibre Colt New Service revolver, but the Enfield remained in service until 1911.
