= Webley RIC =

British revolver

Webley Royal Irish Constabulary revolver
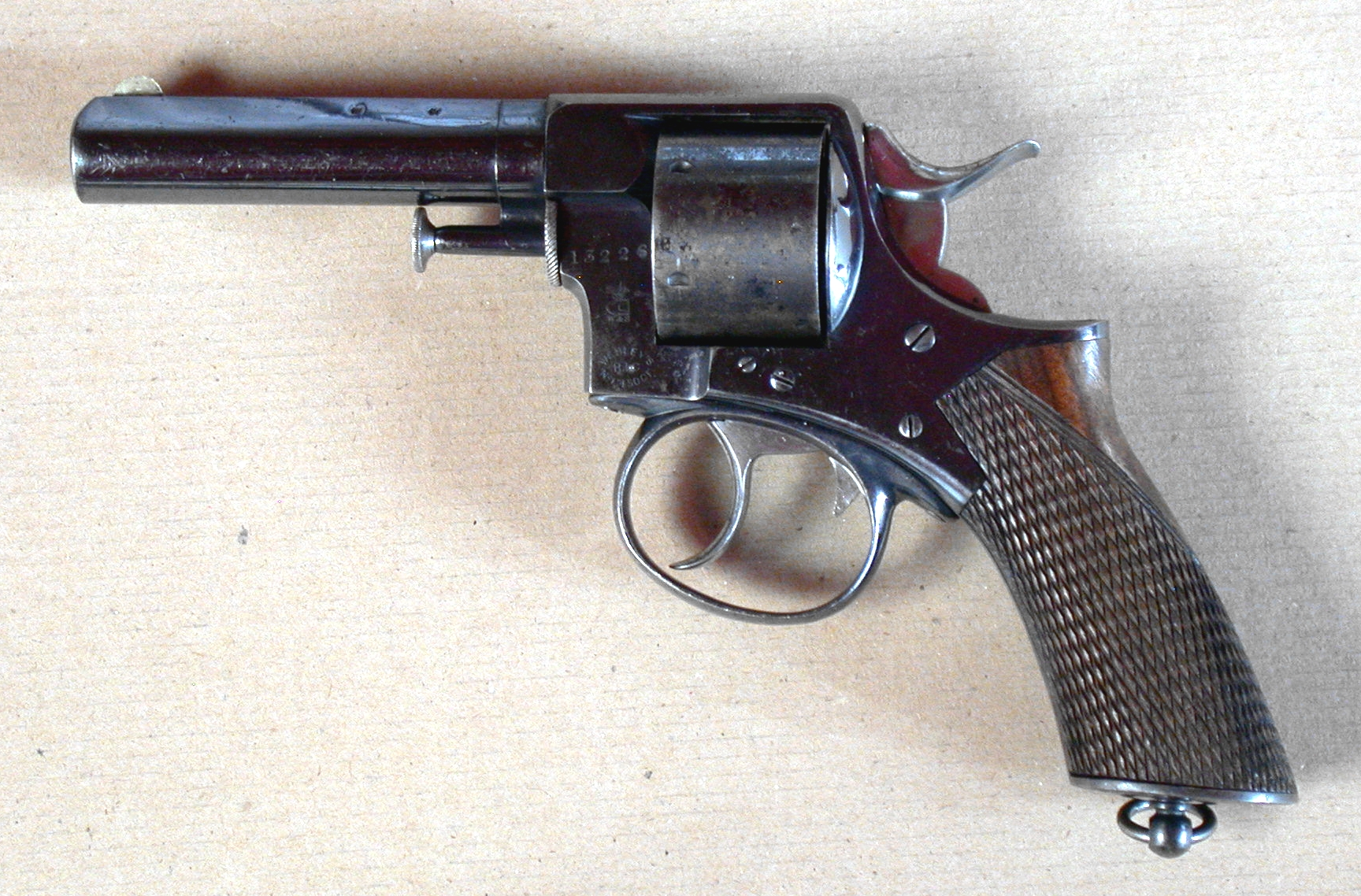
- Webley Royal Irish Constabulary revolver No 1
- Type: Revolver
- Place of origin: United Kingdom

Service history
- In service: 1867–1918
- Wars: Fenian Raid; Anglo-Zulu War; Second Afghan War

Production history
- Designed: 1867
- Manufacturer: Webley & Scott, Birmingham
- Produced: 1867-1898
- Variants: No 1 & No 2 Model

Specifications
- Mass: 30 oz (0.85 kg), unloaded
- Length: 9.25 in. (235 mm)
- Barrel length: 4.5 in. (114 mm)
- Cartridge: .442 Webley cartridge
- Action: Double-action
- Muzzle velocity: c650 ft/s (198 m/s)
- Effective firing range: 25 yd (23 m)
- Maximum firing range: 100 yd (91 m)
- Feed system: 6 shot cylinder
- Sights: Fixed front post and rear notch

The Webley Royal Irish Constabulary revolver is a British double-action, centerfire cartridge revolver designed in 1867.

== History ==
British armsmaker Philip Webley and Son of Birmingham produced their first caplock revolvers (Webley Longspur) in 1853 with limited success, due to the popularity of the already established Adams revolvers.

Taking lead in the new (at the time) centerfire metal cartridge technology, they produced their first breachloading, centerfire cartridge revolvers in 1867.

They were the first popular Webley product that made the firm famous. Due to their quality, they remained in production for more than 30 years.

In 1868, the Royal Irish Constabulary was formed as a paramilitary force armed with carbines and revolvers. As the Webley revolver was adopted as their first service weapon, it was known after that as the Royal Irish Constabulary revolver.

== Characteristics ==
=== No. 1 ===
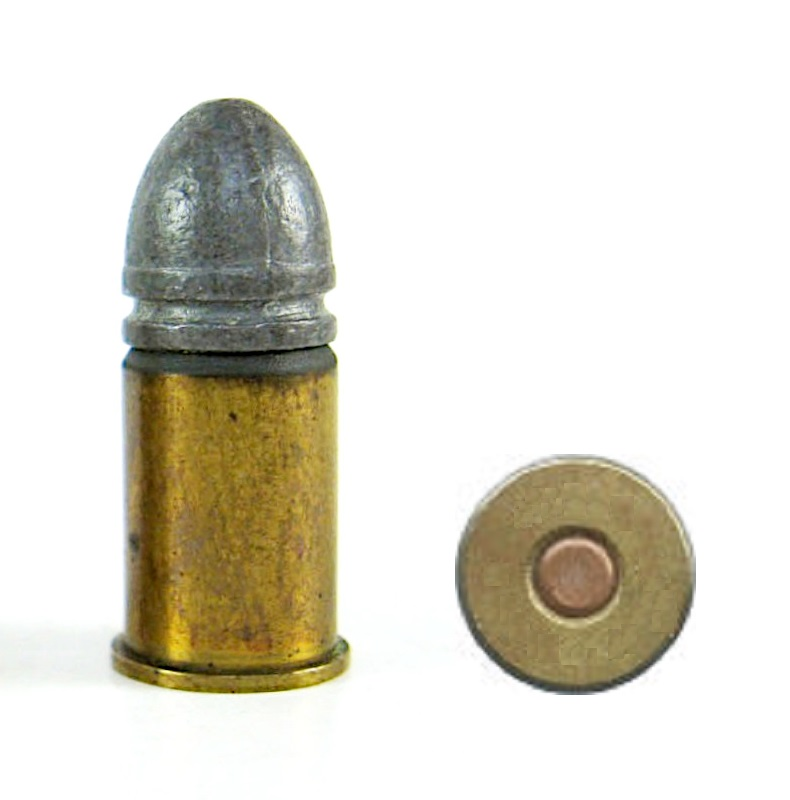
.442 Webley cartridge.

Designed in 1867 for .442 centerfire cartridge, it was one of the earliest British breachloading revolvers. Solid frame revolver, with a round barrel screwed into the frame, and a one piece wooden grip held by two vertical screws.

The foresight is slotted in, mostly semi-round, while the backsight is a long, V-shaped groove on the top strap above the cylinder. It has a loading gate hinged at the bottom that opens sideways, held by a flat spring.

The six cambered cylinder is plain in the early models, while in later ones it was fluted to achieve a small reduction in weight. The ejector rod is mounted on a yoke (swivel) under the barrel and mostly housed in the hollow cylinder arbor, so it can be pulled out and swung to the right when needed. When the ejector rod is drawn out, the cylinder may be removed after drawing the arbor forward.

The revolver has a double-action lock, with a half-cock position for loading.

These revolvers were made in a variety of calibers, but no less than .410 in (10.4 mm). They were widely used all over the British Empire, and copied in various European countries.

In 1872, a pocket model (.442 in) with a 2.5 in barrel was produced, which was the precursor of the famous British Buldog revolvers.

=== No. 2 ===
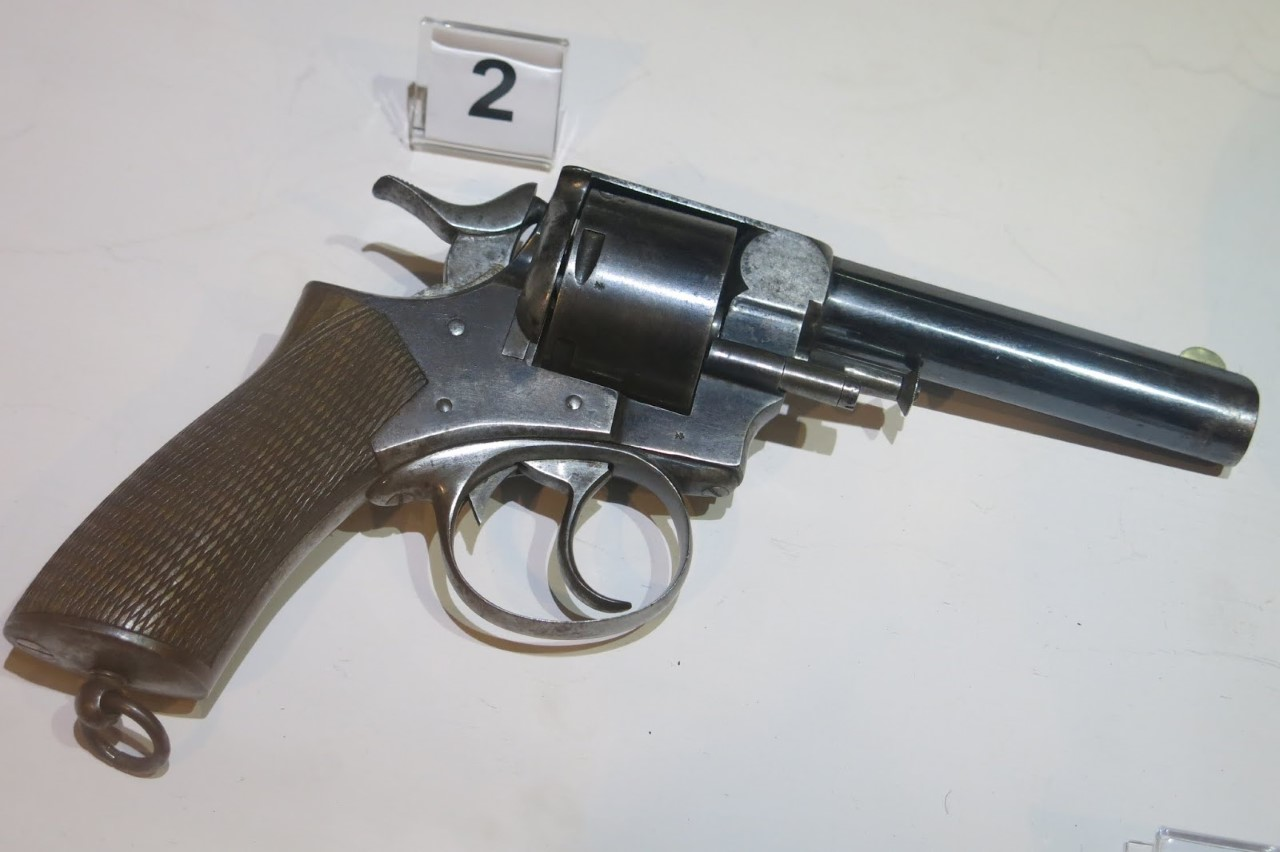
Webley R.I.C. revolver No 2 that belonged to John Chard, commander of the Rorke's Drift in 1879.

Produced from 1872, slightly smaller (8.25 in length, 3.5 in barrel) and lighter (0.76 kg) model, with the same overall characteristics.

They were made in a variety of calibers, from .320 and .380 to .450. Service revolvers were six-shot, but smaller commercial 5-shot variants were also very popular.

== Service ==
Aside from the Royal Irish Constabulary, Webley RIC revolvers were used extensively by United Kingdom and colonial forces.

They immediately became popular with British Army officers, who at the time were expected to purchase their own personal weapons (swords and pistols) on their own expense, as very robust, compact and reliable weapons.

British officers, cavalry soldiers and irregulars carried the Webley RIC in the Anglo-Zulu War (1879). Actual combat usage showed that the revolver was at its most effective within 25 yards.

== Legacy ==
The Webley RIC was one of the earliest British breechloading revolvers and one of the most popular British revolvers of the 19th century.

== Literature ==
- Myatt, Major Frederick (1981). An Illustrated Guide to Pistols and Revolvers. London: Salamander Books Limited. ISBN 0861010973.
- Zhuk, A.B. (1995). Walter, John (ed.). The illustrated encyclopedia of HANDGUNS, pistols and revolvers of the world, 1870 to 1995. Translated by Bobrov, N.N. London: Greenhill Books. pp. 60–61. ISBN 1-85367-187-8.
- Kinard, Jeff (2003). Pistols, An Illustrated History of Their Impact. Santa Barbara, California: ABC-CLIO, Inc. ISBN 1-85109-475-X.
- Laband, John (2009). Historical dictionary of the Zulu wars. Historical dictionaries of war, revolution, and civil unrest. Lanham, Md: Scarecrow Press. ISBN 978-0-8108-6078-0. OCLC 276930370.
