= Service pistol =

Standard-issue pistol

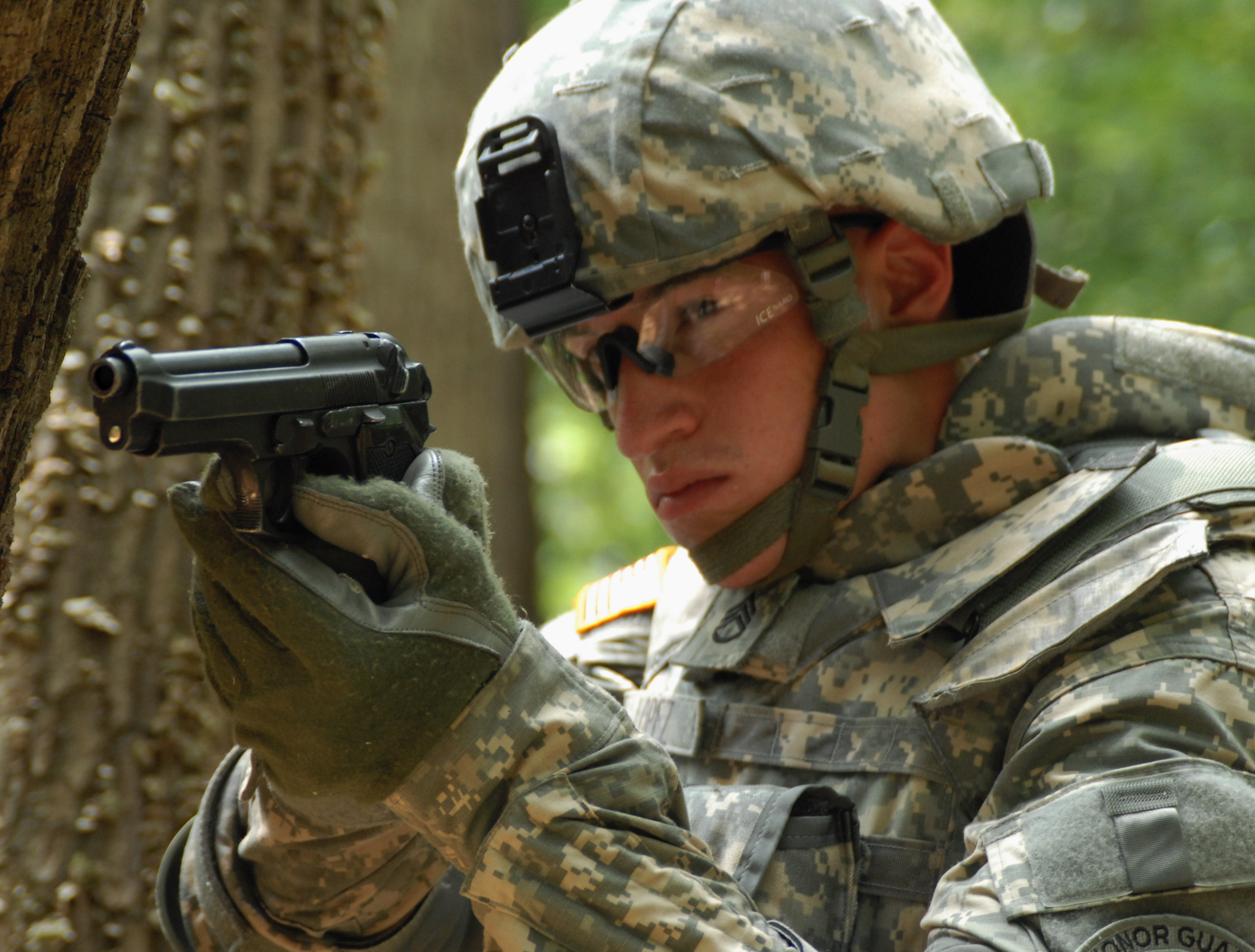
An American soldier aiming his Beretta M9 service pistol, 2009

A service pistol (also known as a standard-issue pistol or a personal ordnance weapon) is any handgun issued to regular military personnel or law enforcement officers. Typically, service pistols are semi-automatic pistols (previously revolvers) issued to commissioned officers, non-commissioned officers, and rear-echelon support personnel for self-defence, though service pistols may also be issued to special forces as a backup for their primary weapons. Pistols are not typically issued to front-line infantry. Before firearms were commonplace, officers and non-commissioned officers typically carried swords.

== History ==
Prior to the introduction of cartridge-loading firearms, there was little standardization with regard to the handguns carried by military personnel, although it had been important for officers, artillerymen, and other auxiliary troops to have a means of defending themselves, especially as it was not always practical for them to have a full-length rifle or carbine.

Traditionally, soldiers, sailors, cavalrymen, and officers had carried swords for both personal protection and use in combat. The development of firearms in the early 14th century changed the way battles were fought, and by the late-15th century it was no longer especially practical to close in hand-to-hand combat range to engage one's opponents, owing to the prevalence of pikes and musket-fire (pike and shot) on the battlefield.

Training was also a factor—it took a very long time to train new recruits in the use of longbows and swords—whereas the basic operation of an arquebus could be taught in a comparatively short time. As a result, swords were retained only by officers (who were less likely to be at the front of the pike-and-musket hedge) and by cavalry, for whom early single-shot handguns were of limited use.

The invention of the revolver in 1836, finally made a service pistol practical, as prior to this pistols had largely been single-shot weapons usually of no particular standardized pattern.

Although officers traditionally had been obliged to buy their own weapons, non-commissioned officers (NCOs) and other enlisted personnel were generally issued their weapons (which they were then expected to either pay for or return to the quartermaster if they were promoted). Service pistols, on the other hand, were generally issued to officers, NCOs, and others who needed to carry personal weapons as part of their duties. Hence, it was quite common for officers to carry government-issued service pistols in combat.

The first service handguns were revolvers, but the development of semi-automatic pistols (the first practical example being the Mauser C96 "Broomhandle") gradually led to their replacement by semi-automatic handguns, such as the well-known German P08 Luger, the first semi-automatic service pistol to be widely adopted by an industrialised nation.

The British Army was the last major military service to adopt a semi-automatic service pistol as a standard sidearm, phasing out their Webley Mk IV, Enfield No 2 Mk I, and Smith & Wesson Victory revolvers in 1969, after which the Browning Hi-Power became the Army's official service pistol.

== Modern issue ==
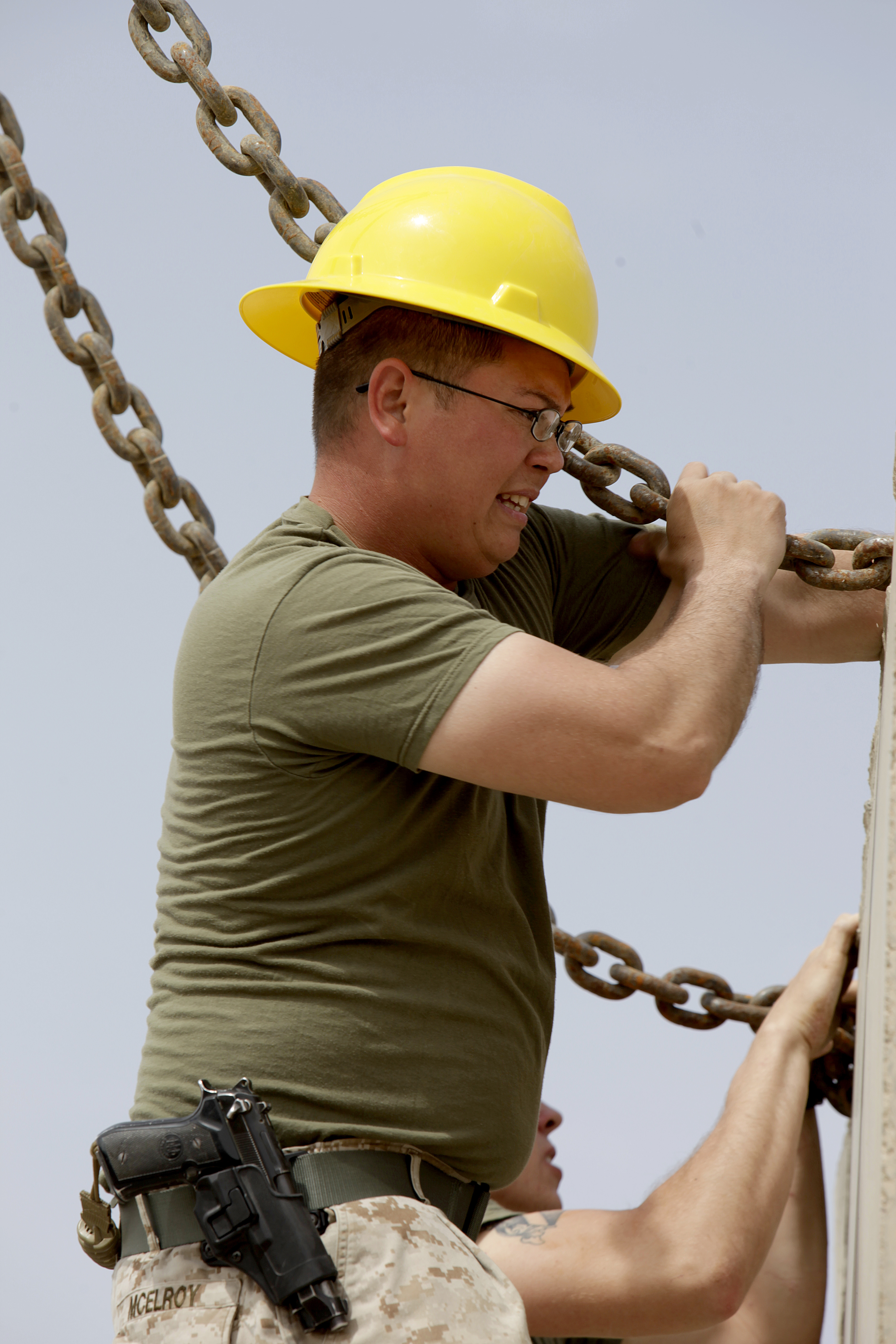
A rear echelon US Marine with an issued M9 Beretta.

Special operations soldiers often carry a handgun as a secondary weapon to serve in a supplementary capacity to their primary weapon (a rifle, carbine, submachine gun, or shotgun); this practice is not as prevalent among conventional soldiers. Soldiers who do not serve in a direct combat role are often issued a pistol (such as officers, artillery crews, and other rear-echelon personnel), but conventional riflemen are not generally issued a pistol as part of their standard kit. However, drivers are often issued a handgun since, while driving, their rifle will be stowed on a rack and thus difficult to make ready quickly in an emergency, whereas a handgun is more easily accessible. Service pistols are issued to military police and other soldiers acting in a law enforcement capacity as part of their duties.

The tradition of issuing pistols to officers as a primary weapon is being phased out by many nations. The United States Marine Corps, for example, requires all enlisted personnel and all officers below the rank of Lieutenant colonel to carry the M27 IAR as their primary weapon. British officers on combat duty are also normally issued with the standard rifle, but are not required to carry it with them at all times; for example, while operating as support staff the rifle would be stored in the base armory, though this is the same for most support staff.

== See also ==
- Service rifle
