= .44 Bull Dog =

Revolver cartridge

.44 Bull Dog Cartridge
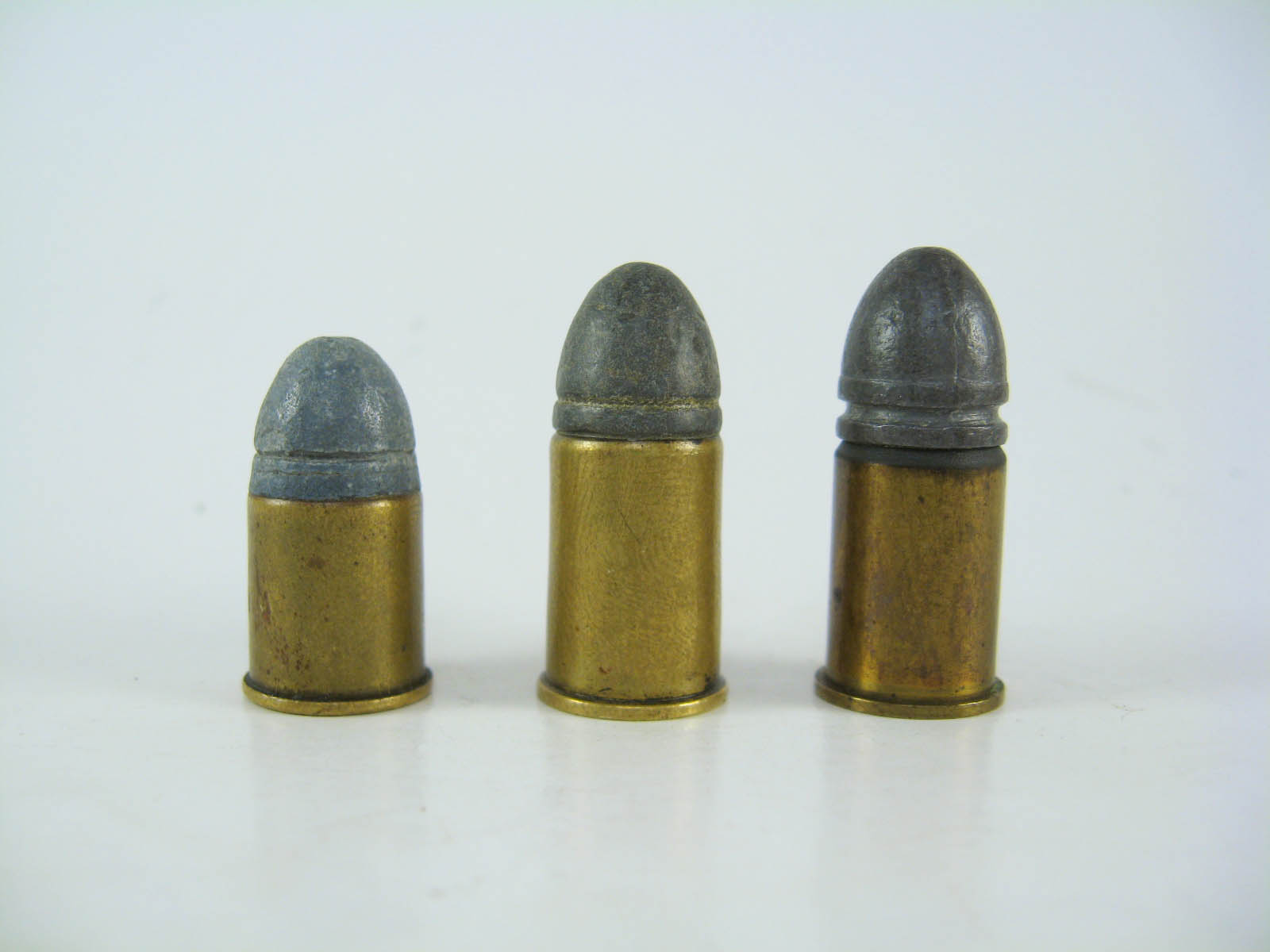
- .44 Bull Dog (Peters), .44 Webley (UMC) and .442 Revolver (Eley)
- Type: Revolver
- Place of origin: United States

Production history
- Designed: 1880s
- Produced: 1880s-1930's

Specifications
- Case type: rimmed straight
- Bullet diameter: .445 in (11.3 mm)
- Neck diameter: .447 in (11.4 mm)
- Base diameter: .454 in (11.5 mm)
- Rim diameter: .488 in (12.4 mm)
- Case length: .526 in (13.4 mm)
- Overall length: .914 in (23.2 mm)
- Rifling twist: 1:21 in (530 mm)
- Primer type: Boxer

Ballistic performance
Bullet mass/type	Velocity	Energy
168 gr (11 g) (U.S. factory load)	460 ft/s (140 m/s)	80 ft⋅lbf (110 J)
- Sources: Barnes & Amber 1972

The .44 Bull Dog was an American centerfire revolver cartridge produced from the 1880s until the 1930s.

== Description ==
No known firearm was chambered exclusively for the .44 Bull Dog cartridge: It was a shorter and less powerful option for use in revolvers chambered for the .44 Webley cartridge (American name of the British .442 Webley revolver round). The .44 Bull Dog cartridge was manufactured in the US and Canada, probably for those bothered by the sharp recoil of the more powerful .44 Webley round in such small guns, or who were particularly cost conscious. (Typically, in the late 19th century U.S., a box of .44 Bull Dog cartridges cost $0.68 for 50 rounds, compared to $0.90 for 50 of the longer .44 Webley round. The .44 Bull Dog and .44 Webley cartridges continued to be commercially offered in the U.S. until 1938 or 1939.) Also, the Bull Dog was very easy to carry.

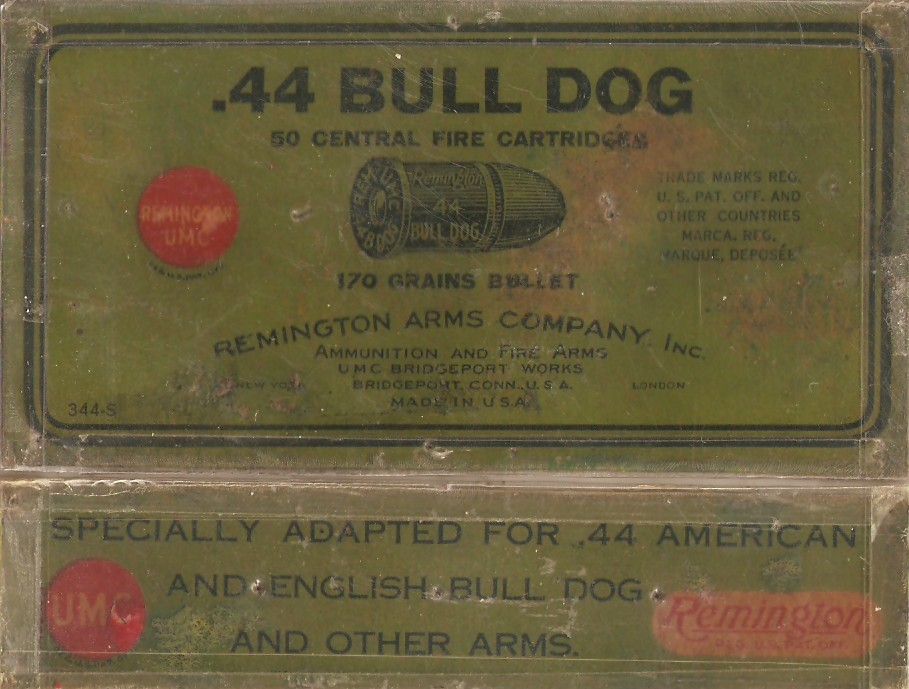
Remington/UMC .44 Bull Dog Box Labels

Webley's British Bulldog revolver was a popular and widely copied self-defense or "pocket" gun (so named for being designed early 1870s to be carried in a pocket. Today such guns might be a known as a snubnose or carry gun).

A black powder round, the .44 Bull Dog, as manufactured by firms such as Winchester, used a 168–170 grain bullet and 15 grains powder, compared to a 200–230 grain bullet and 17–20 grains powder for the parent .44 Webley round. It proved a great deal better than contemporary rimfire rounds, being in a class with the .41 Short Colt. However, by modern standards, the .44 Bull Dog was an extremely marginal round, not really suitable for anything but close range, which is how it normally would have been defensively used.

== See also ==
- List of cartridges by caliber
- 11mm caliber

== Sources ==
- Barnes, Frank C., ed. by John T. Amber. ".44 Bull Dog", in Cartridges of the World, pp. 170 & 177. Northfield, IL: DBI Books, 1972. ISBN 0-695-80326-3.
- ______ and _____. ".25 (6.35mm) Automatic Pisto", in Cartridges of the World, p. 149. Northfield, IL: DBI Books, 1972. ISBN 0-695-80326-3.
- Dowell, William Chipchase. The Webley Story. Kirkland, WA: Commonwealth Heritage Foundation, 1987.
- Ficken, Homer R.. Webley's The British Bull Dog Revolver, Serial Numbering and Variations. Retrieved on 2011-04-03.
