= .44 Russian =

Revolver cartridge designed by Smith & Wesson (S&W)

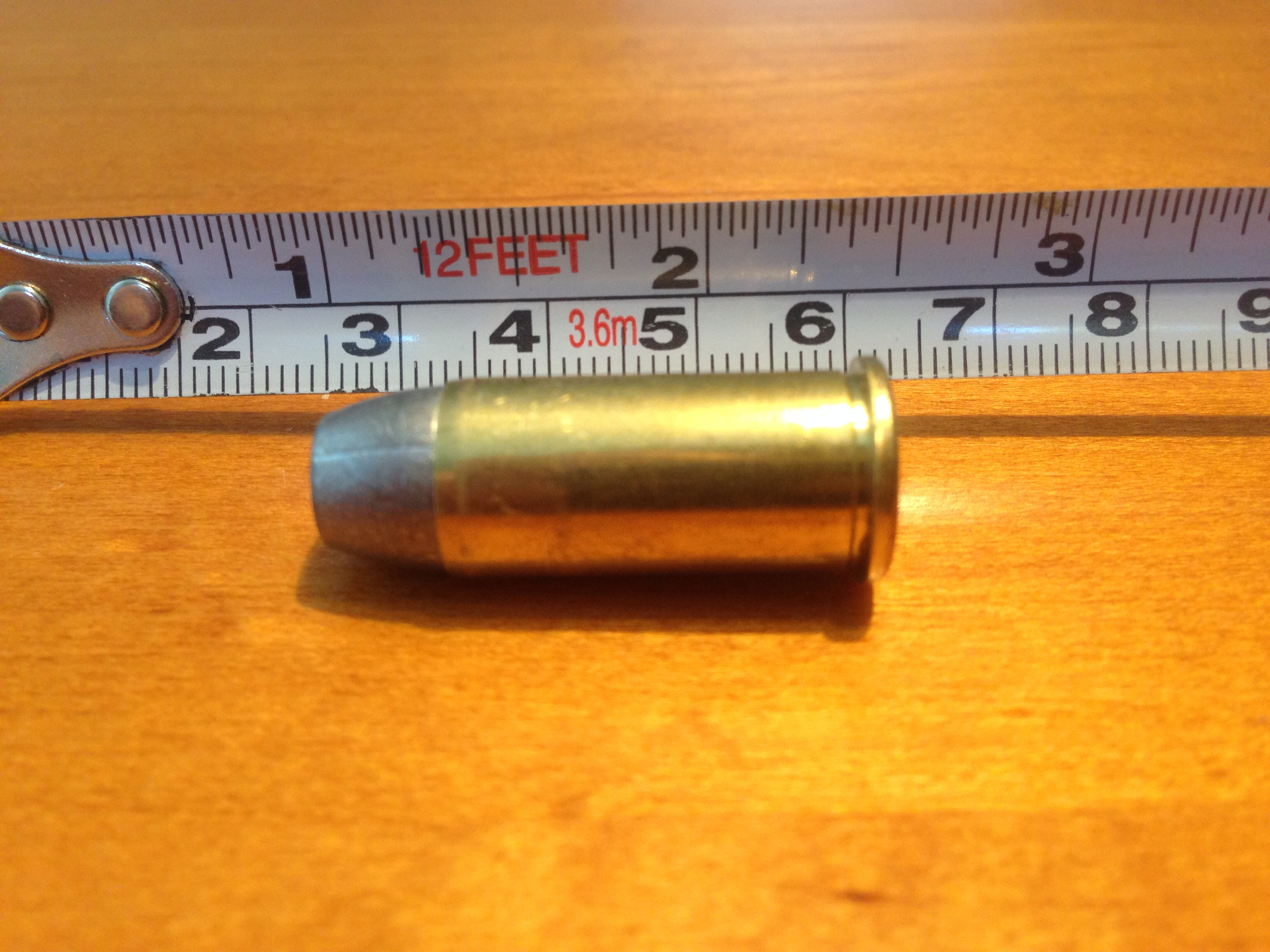
- .44 Russian
- Type: Revolver
- Place of origin: United States

Production history
- Designer: Smith & Wesson
- Designed: 1870
- Manufacturer: Smith & Wesson
- Produced: 1870–present

Specifications
- Parent case: .44 S&W American
- Case type: Rimmed, straight
- Bullet diameter: .429 in (10.9 mm)
- Neck diameter: .457 in (11.6 mm)
- Base diameter: .457 in (11.6 mm)
- Rim diameter: .515 in (13.1 mm)
- Rim thickness: .060 in (1.5 mm)
- Case length: 0.970 in (24.6 mm)
- Overall length: 1.43 in (36 mm)
- Case capacity: 27.10 gr H_{2}O (1.756 cm^{3})
- Rifling twist: 1 in 20 in (510 mm)
- Primer type: Large Pistol
- Maximum pressure: 14,500 psi (100 MPa)

Ballistic performance
Bullet mass/type	Velocity	Energy
246 gr (16 g) lead round nose	750 ft/s (230 m/s)	310 ft⋅lbf (420 J)

The .44 Russian / 10.9x24mmR, (commonly known as the .44 S&W Russian), is a black-powder centerfire metallic revolver cartridge developed and produced by Smith & Wesson in 1870. The .44 Russian design was the first use of an internally lubricated bullet in modern firearm ammunition.

== Development history ==
In the early 1870s, General Alexander Gorloff, the military attaché assigned to the Russian Embassy in Washington, D.C., approached Smith & Wesson about the possibility of negotiating a military sales contract for the purchase of a large number of Smith & Wesson Model 3 revolvers for the Imperial Russian Army.

However, Gorloff had some reservations about the standard .44 S&W American chambering which, similar to today's .22 long rifle, had an externally lubricated heeled bullet. Gorloff correctly recognized that such ammunition tends to pick up debris and contaminants which erode the bore when fired, so a qualification of the purchase contract was that Smith & Wesson develop an internally lubricated version of their .44 round.

Smith & Wesson did so by reducing the diameter of the .44 bullet to .429 and adding lubrication grooves to its base. This evolutionary improvement became an archetype, influencing future cartridge designs. With improved firearm metallurgy available, Smith & Wesson increased the bullet weight of the new cartridge to 246 grains while retaining a heavy 23-grain black-powder propellant charge, which almost equaled that of the .44 American and produced a muzzle velocity of roughly 750 ft/s. As a result of these changes, the .44 Russian generated a much higher chamber pressure of 12,000 copper units of pressure (CUP) compared to the older .44 American round, which generated only 6,000–8,000 CUP. To prevent the new high-pressure ammunition from being fired in .44 American revolvers with disastrous results, the overall cartridge case length was increased by .06 in to 0.970 in. In addition, the cylinder design of the No. 3 revolver had to be changed from the straight-bored .44 American configuration to a stepped arrangement, which was .457 in at the rear of the cylinder to accept the case and narrower from the case shoulder forward to give a tight fit for the smaller bore .44 Russian bullet.

In 1872, while in the US, Grand Duke Alexei Alexandrovich visited the Smith & Wesson factory to review the progress of the Russian order. The American gun maker made him the gift of an engraved presentation Model 3 valued at more than $400. The Grand Duke was also feted with a U.S. government–paid buffalo hunting trip with William Cody and U.S. Army officers Philip Sheridan and George Armstrong Custer, where he was impressed with Cody's adeptness with firearms.

Over 131,000 S&W Model 3 revolvers were eventually sold to the Russian Army. In addition to the S&W-made revolvers, Belgian-, Spanish- and German-made copies were adopted by several European countries and were used until the 1920s. The .44 Russian chambering became a hit in the domestic market as well, gaining a reputation as the first American revolver cartridge offering inherent accuracy. In time it set many records, eventually becoming known as an established target round, enabling skilled shooters to achieve 3-inch (76 mm) groups at 50 yards (46 m); notable for the time and still impressive today.

== Successor designs ==
The .44 Russian was the parent cartridge for the .44 Special introduced in 1907, which in turn was the parent to the .44 Magnum in 1956.

== Current loadings ==
A number of ammunition companies still manufacture .44 Russian ammunition:

- Black Hills Cowboy action ammunition 210 grain lead flat point
- Fiocchi ammunition 247 grain lead round nose
- Ten-X ammunition blank BPC
- Ten-X ammunition 200 grain lead round nose and flat point
- JMJ Smith Ammo Inc. ammunition 200 grain lead round nose, flat point

Additionally, Starline Brass makes new, unprimed cartridge cases in .44 Russian for handloaders.

== See also ==
- List of rimmed cartridges
- List of handgun cartridges
