= .44 S&W American =

Revolver cartridge designed by Smith & Wesson

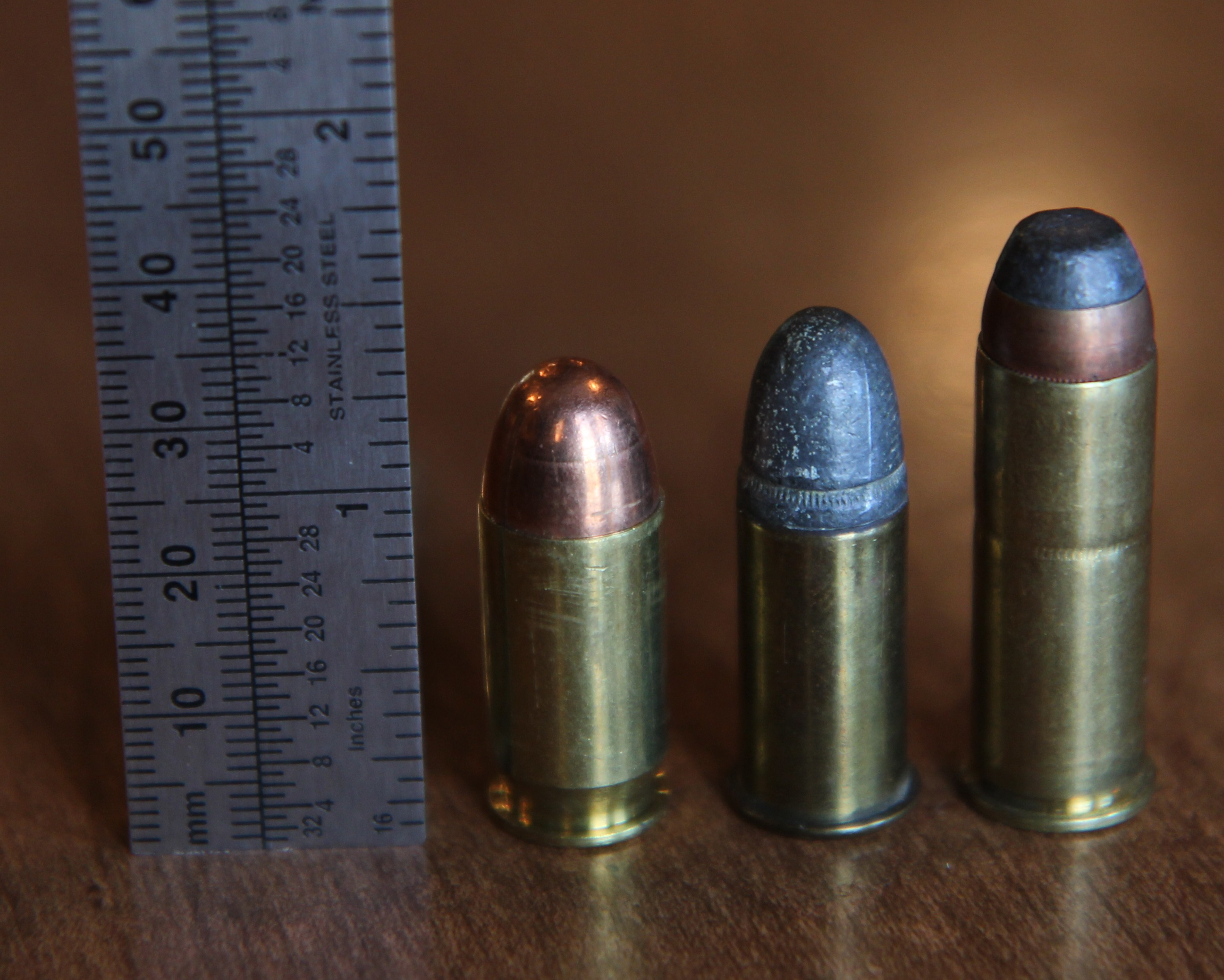
- .44 S&W American (center) with .45 ACP (left) and .44 Magnum (Right)
- Type: Revolver
- Place of origin: USA

Production history
- Produced: 1869–1940

Specifications
- Case type: Rimmed, straight
- Bullet diameter: .434 in (11.0 mm)
- Neck diameter: .438 in (11.1 mm)
- Base diameter: .440 in (11.2 mm)
- Rim diameter: .506 in (12.9 mm)
- Case length: 0.91 in (23 mm)
- Overall length: 1.44 in (37 mm)
- Rifling twist: 1:20
- Primer type: Large pistol
- Maximum CUP: 8,000 CUP

Ballistic performance
Bullet mass/type	Velocity	Energy
205 gr (13 g) (factory load)	682 ft/s (208 m/s)	212 ft⋅lbf (287 J)
218 gr (14 g) (25 gr {} FFg)	660 ft/s (200 m/s)	196 ft⋅lbf (266 J)
200 gr (13 g) (max)	810 ft/s (250 m/s)	296 ft⋅lbf (401 J)
205 gr (13 g) (Lyman #429478)	800 ft/s (240 m/s)	291 ft⋅lbf (395 J)
- Source(s): Barnes & Amber 1972

The .44 S&W American / 11x23mmR (commonly called the .44 American) is an American rimmed centerfire revolver cartridge.

== Description ==
Used in the Smith & Wesson Model 3, it was introduced around 1869. Between 1871 and 1873, the .44 Model 3 was used as the standard United States Army sidearm. It was also offered in the Merwin Hulbert & Co. Army revolvers.

The cartridge used an outside lubricated heeled bullet, either Boxer or Berdan priming, and both black and smokeless powder loadings. The heeled bullets make the cartridge incompatible with .44 Russian, .44 Special, and .44 Magnum, which was made larger in diameter and longer to cover the exposed part of the bullet.

Its power resembles the .41 Long Colt, .32-20 Winchester, or .44-40 Winchester, and it could be used to hunt small game at short range.

The .44 American ceased to be commercially available around 1940. It can be handloaded by shortening and reforming .41 Magnum cases.

During the gunfight at the O.K. Corral on October 26, 1881, Wyatt Earp carried an 8-inch Model 3 in .44 American. Earp had received the weapon as a gift from Tombstone, Arizona, mayor and Tombstone Epitaph newspaper editor John Clum.

== See also ==
- List of rimmed cartridges
- List of cartridges by caliber
- Table of handgun and rifle cartridges
- 11mm caliber

== Sources ==
- Barnes, Frank C., ed. by John T. Amber. ".44 S&W American", in Cartridges of the World, pp. 167 & 177. Northfield, IL: DBI Books, 1972. ISBN 0-695-80326-3.
- Barnes, Frank C., ed. by John T. Amber. ".32-20 Winchester" in Cartridges of the World, p. 46. Northfield, IL: DBI Books, 1972. ISBN 0-695-80326-3.
- Barnes, Frank C., ed. by John T. Amber. ".44-40 Winchester" in Cartridges of the World, p. 61. Northfield, IL: DBI Books, 1972. ISBN 0-695-80326-3.
