= Webley & Scott =

British arms manufacturer

- Industry: Gun manufacturer
- Founded: Birmingham, England 1790; 236 years ago
- Founder: William Davies
- Headquarters: United Kingdom
- Products: Revolvers, Air guns, Shotguns
- Website: www.webley.co.uk

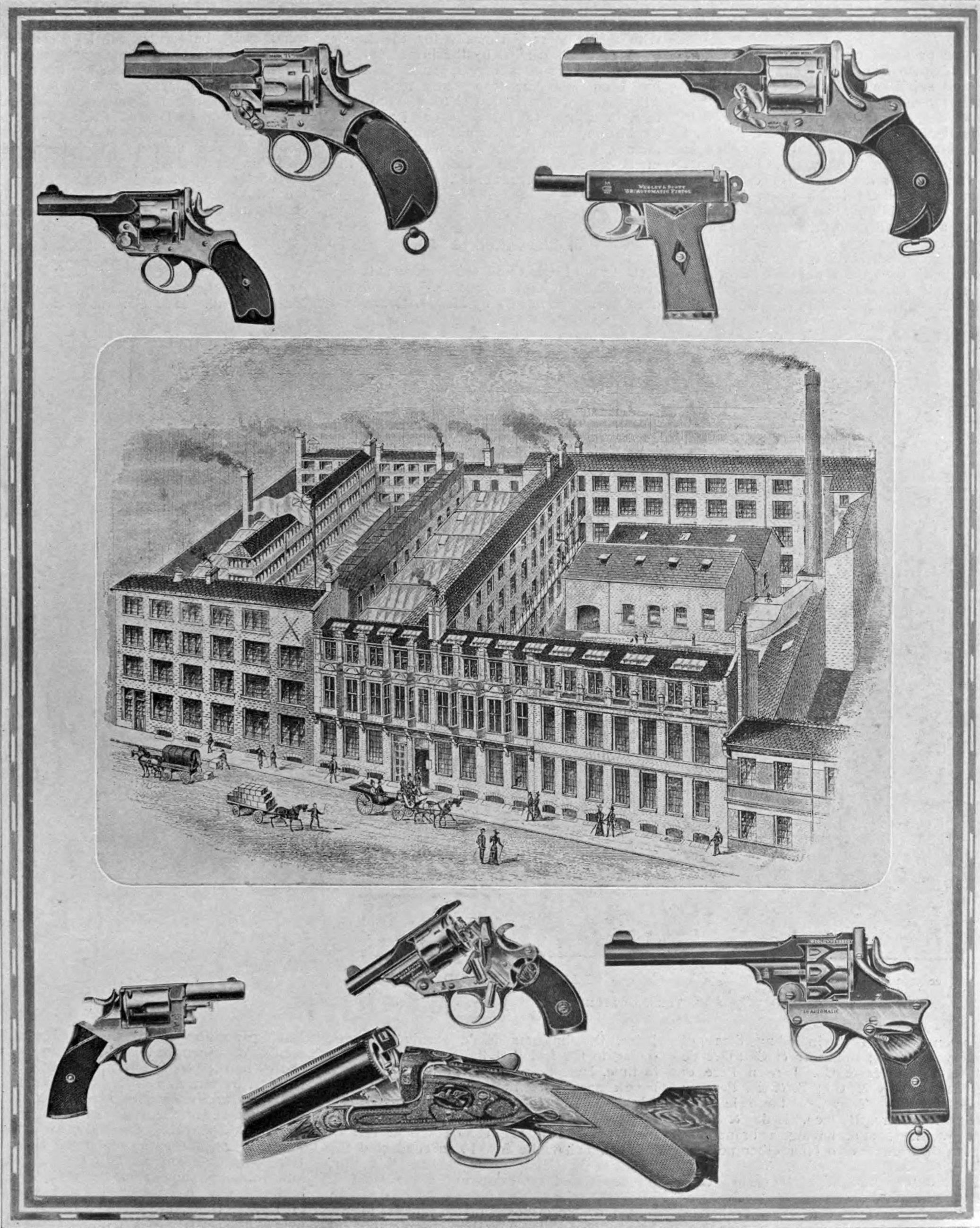
Webley & Scott Firearms of Birmingham

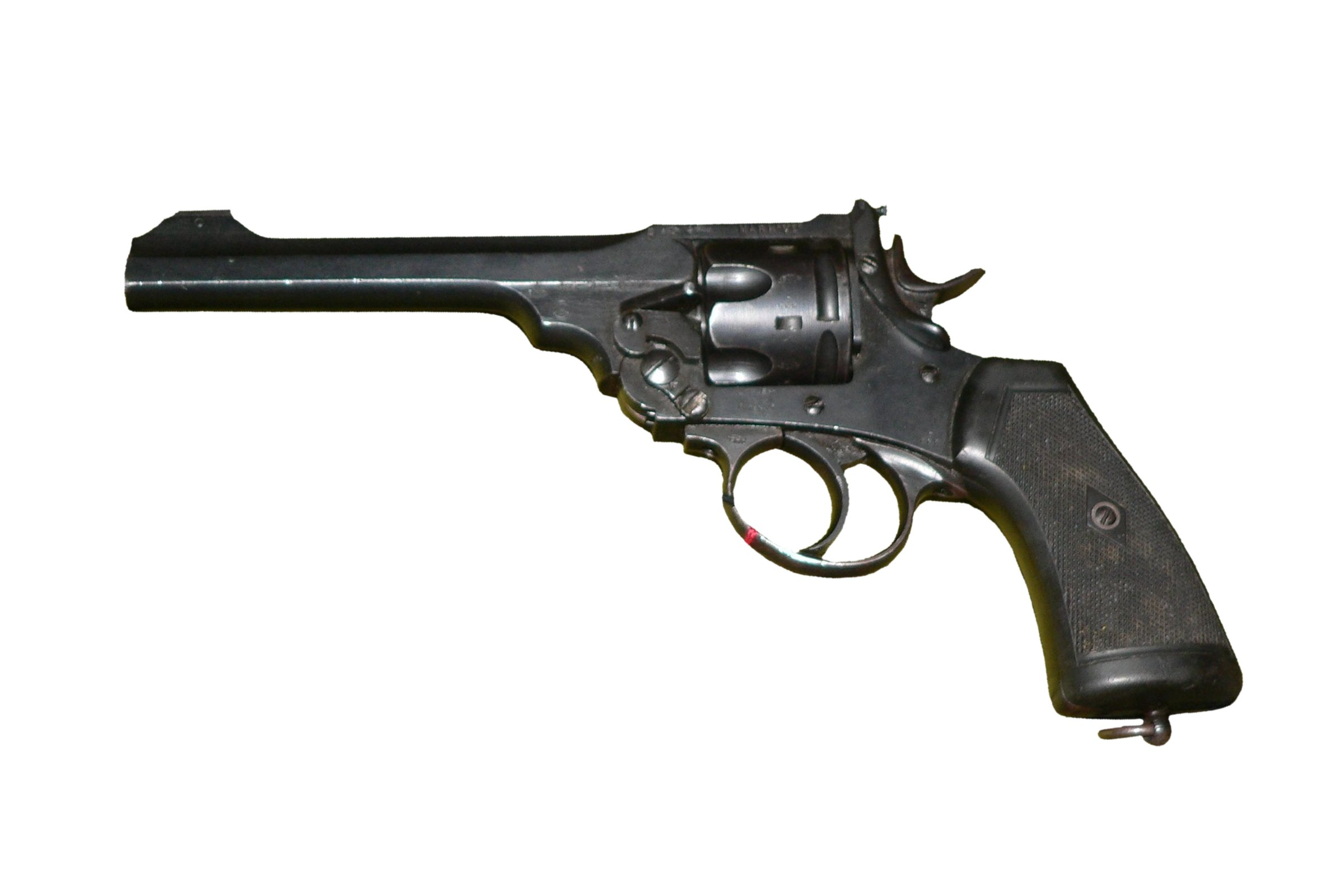
The Webley Mk VI, standard sidearm of the British Army 1915–1932

Webley & Scott is an arms manufacturer founded in Birmingham, England. Webley produced handguns and long guns from 1834 to 1979, when the company ceased to manufacture firearms and instead turned its attention to producing air pistols and air rifles. In 2010 Webley & Scott restarted the production of shotguns for commercial sale.

Webley is famous for the revolvers and automatic pistols it supplied to the British Empire's military, particularly the British Army, from 1887 through both World War I and World War II.

== History ==
The Webley company was founded in the late 18th century by William Davies, who made bullet moulds. It was taken over in 1834 by his son-in-law, Philip Webley, who began producing percussion sporting guns. The manufacture of revolvers, for which the firm became famous, began twenty years later. Their first percussion revolver, Webley Longspur, entered production in 1853. Due to heavy competition from Colt's and Adams revolvers at the time, sales of the early Webley revolvers was only modest. At that time the company was named P. Webley & Son. In 1897, Webley amalgamated with W & C Scott and Sons to become The Webley & Scott Revolver and Arms Company Ltd of Birmingham.

Webley's revolvers became the official British sidearm in 1887, remaining in British service until 1964. After 1921 Webley service revolvers were manufactured by the government-owned Royal Small Arms Factory in Enfield.

In 1932 the Enfield No.2 .38 inch calibre revolver, became the standard British service revolver. However, wartime shortages ensured that all marks of the Webley, including models in .455 and .38/200, remained in use through World War Two. The .455 Mk.VI was declared obsolete in 1945 but the .38 Mk.IV remained in service as a substitute standard weapon into the early 1960s.

In 1920, the passing of the Firearms Act in the UK, which limited the availability of handguns to civilians, caused their sales to plummet. The company adapted by producing pneumatic guns, their first being the Mark I air pistol.

Demand for air guns increased rapidly in the 1920s and Webley's business began to grow again, with an inevitable peak related to weapons supply for British military use during the Second World War. Declining sales led to the decision to give up firearms manufacture completely in 1979, however air gun production at the Birmingham factory continued until 22 December 2005, when the company closed down. Webley's dependent company - Venom Custom Shop - ceased trading as well. It was then bought by Wolverhampton-based company Airgunsport. At this time Airgunsport relocated the manufacture of all Webley guns to Turkey.

Webley & Scott Ltd is owned by both the Fuller Group and John Bright. John Bright is also co-owner of Highland Outdoors Limited who are the UK distributors for Webley, Webley & Scott and AGS.

== Production ==
Until 1979 Webley & Scott manufactured shotguns and revolvers for private use, as well as producing sidearms for military and police use. This came to include both revolvers and self-loading (semi-automatic) pistols.

Webley's production originally consisted of hand-crafted firearms, although mass-production was later introduced to supply police and military buyers.

The first Webley production revolver appeared in 1853. Known as the Longspur it was a muzzle-loaded percussion cap and ball pistol. Some consider it to be the finest revolver of its day as it could shoot as fast as the contemporary Colt revolvers and was faster to load. However the hand-made Longspur could not compete in price with mass-produced revolvers such as the Colt, and production never equalled that of Webley's competitors Adams (Deane, Adams & Deane) or Tranter.

Webley's first popular success came with its first double-action revolver, adopted by the Royal Irish Constabulary in 1867.

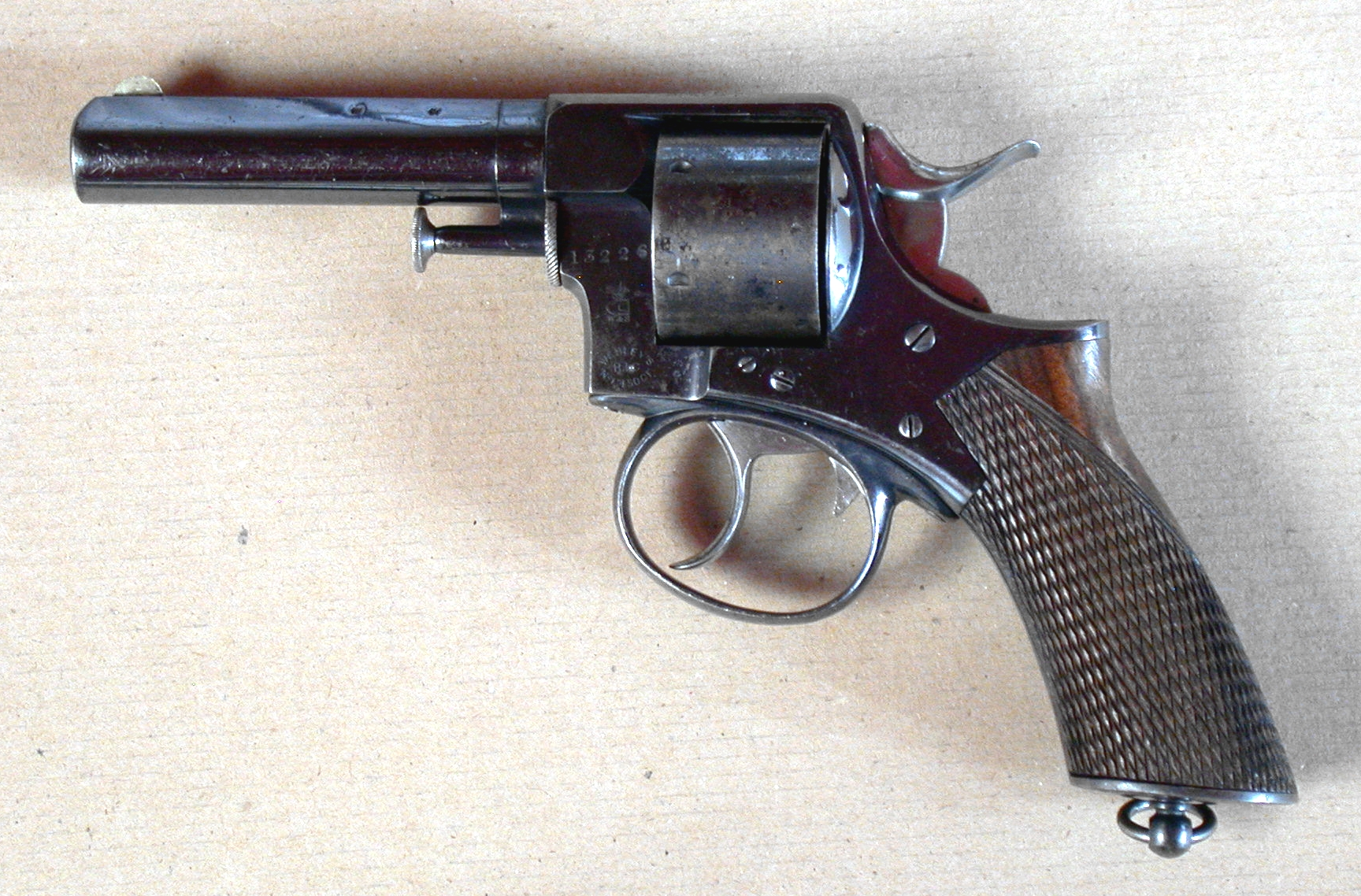
Webley 1868 RIC No. 1 Revolver cal 450 CF

There is a well-known story that a pair of Webley RIC Model revolvers were presented to Brevet Major General George Armstrong Custer by Lord Berkeley Paget in 1869, and it is believed that General Custer was using them at the time of his death in the Battle of the Little Bighorn.

There is some question whether the gun or guns presented to George Armstrong Custer were Webley RIC's. Other sources indicate that Lord Berkeley Paget presented Custer with a Galand & Sommerville 44 calibre revolver (manufactured in England by the firm of Braendlin & Sommerville) and gave another to Tom Custer. Of course, it is possible that Lord Berkeley Paget may have given Custer two revolvers, both a Galand & Sommerville and a Webley RIC or even given the Custer brothers, in some combination, a pair of Webley RICs and a pair of Galand & Sommervilles. A cased Galand & Sommerville revolver certainly formed part of Tom Custer's estate. Galand & Sommerville 44 revolvers were made to use the same ammunition as the first Webley RIC's, i.e. Webley's .442 centre-fire cartridge.

Almost all of Webley's subsequent revolvers were of a top-break design. A pivoting lever on the side of the gun's upper receiver was pressed to release the barrel and cylinder assembly, which then tilts up and forward on a bottom-front pivot. After loading, the assembly is tilted back into firing position and locked closed.

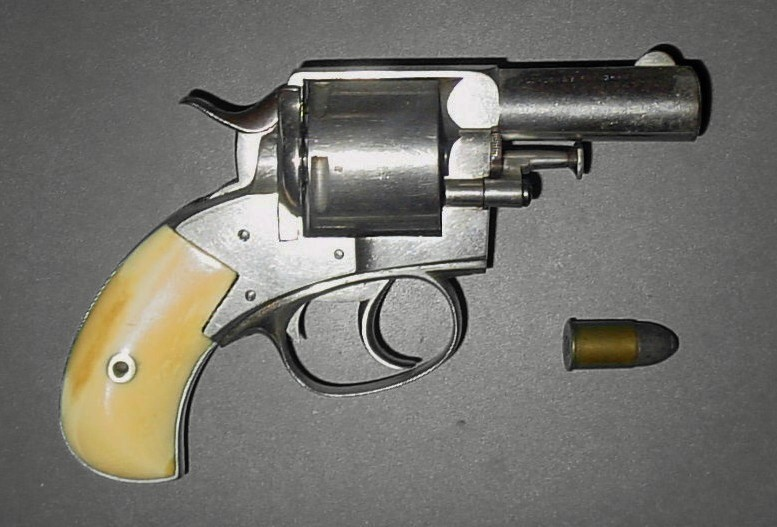
Webley "The British Bull Dog" Revolver cal 450 CF - 1870s

Webley went on to produce more revolvers for the civilian market. Webley's popular pocket revolver, The British Bull Dog, was developed in 1872, available in .44 Short Rimfire, .442 and .450 calibers, and widely exported and copied. Smaller scale versions in .320 and .380 calibers were added later.

Although often attributed to Webley, Webley only produced some of the revolvers now commonly referred to as Webley .577 Boxer Revolvers, which used the most powerful handgun cartridge of the day, the .577 Boxer. It was produced by Webley under licence from the firm of William Tranter of Birmingham, whose design it actually was. Webley was just one of several firms licensed to use Tranter's double-action lock and particularly Tranter's patented revolving recoil shield, which was a key feature of the early .577 calibre revolvers.

In 1879 Webley developed & sold commercially a rugged and powerful revolver intended for the British military, the WG or Webley Government in .455/.476, the WG's cylinder was long enough for .44 Russian & .45 Colt length rounds [Jim Farmer has seen .45 Colt chambered WG models, but is unsure if they were converted .455s- further research is needed for WG chamberings- he has seen Belgian WG copies made in .44-40]. The WG frame & cylinder were then shortened for the .455 & the variant was adopted in the 1880s as the Webley Mk 1.

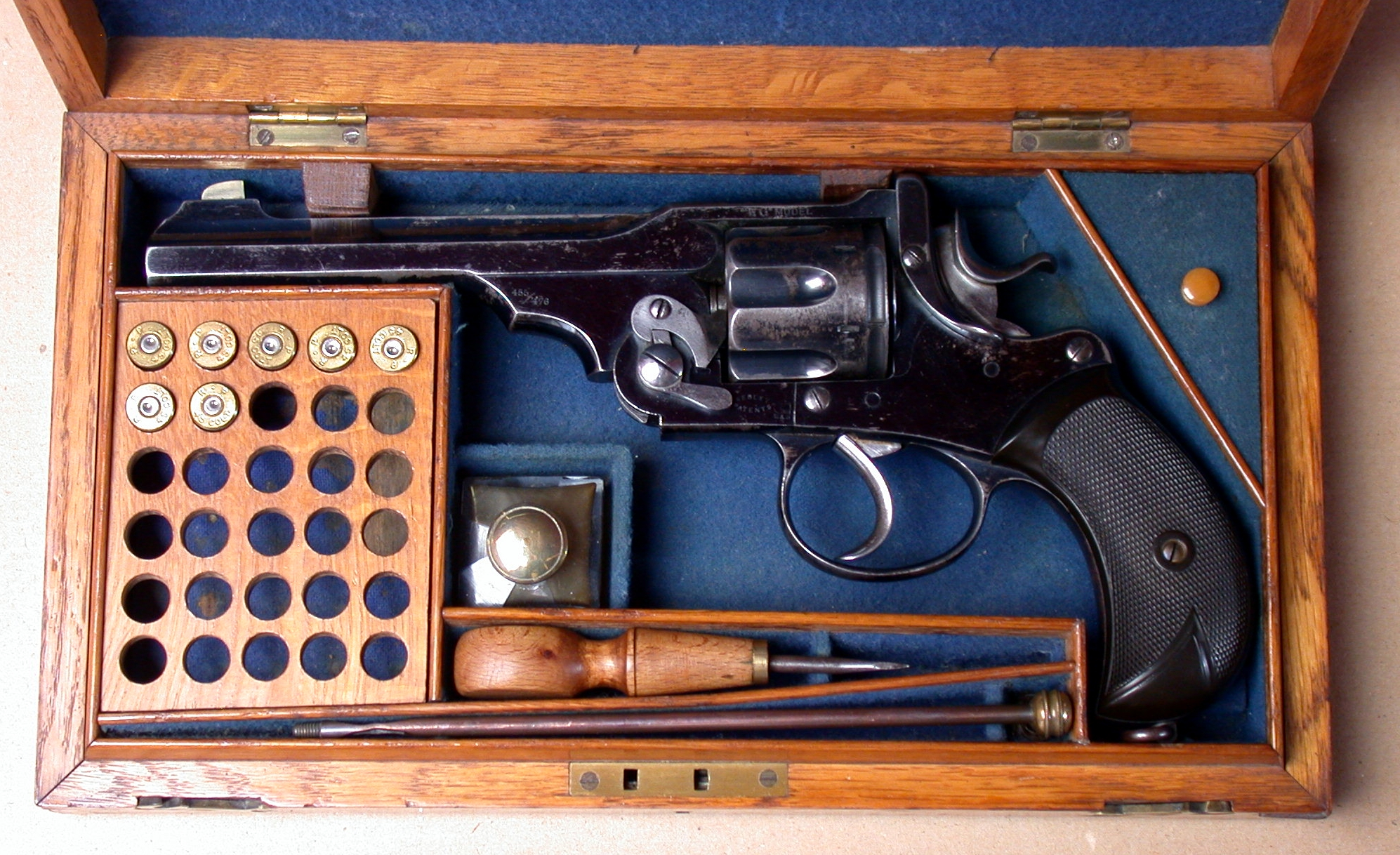
Webley "WG" Army Model (a.k.a. Webley Government) Revolver cal 455/476 (.476 Enfield)

Nicknamed "the British Peacemaker" in the United States, the Mk 1 was manufactured in .450, .455 Webley, and .476 calibre and founded a family of revolvers that were the standard handguns of the British Army, Royal Navy, and British police constabularies from 1887 to 1918. The Mark VI (known as the Webley Revolver No. 1 Mark VI after 1927) was the last standard service pistol made by Webley; the most widely produced of their revolvers, 300,000 were made for service during World War I.

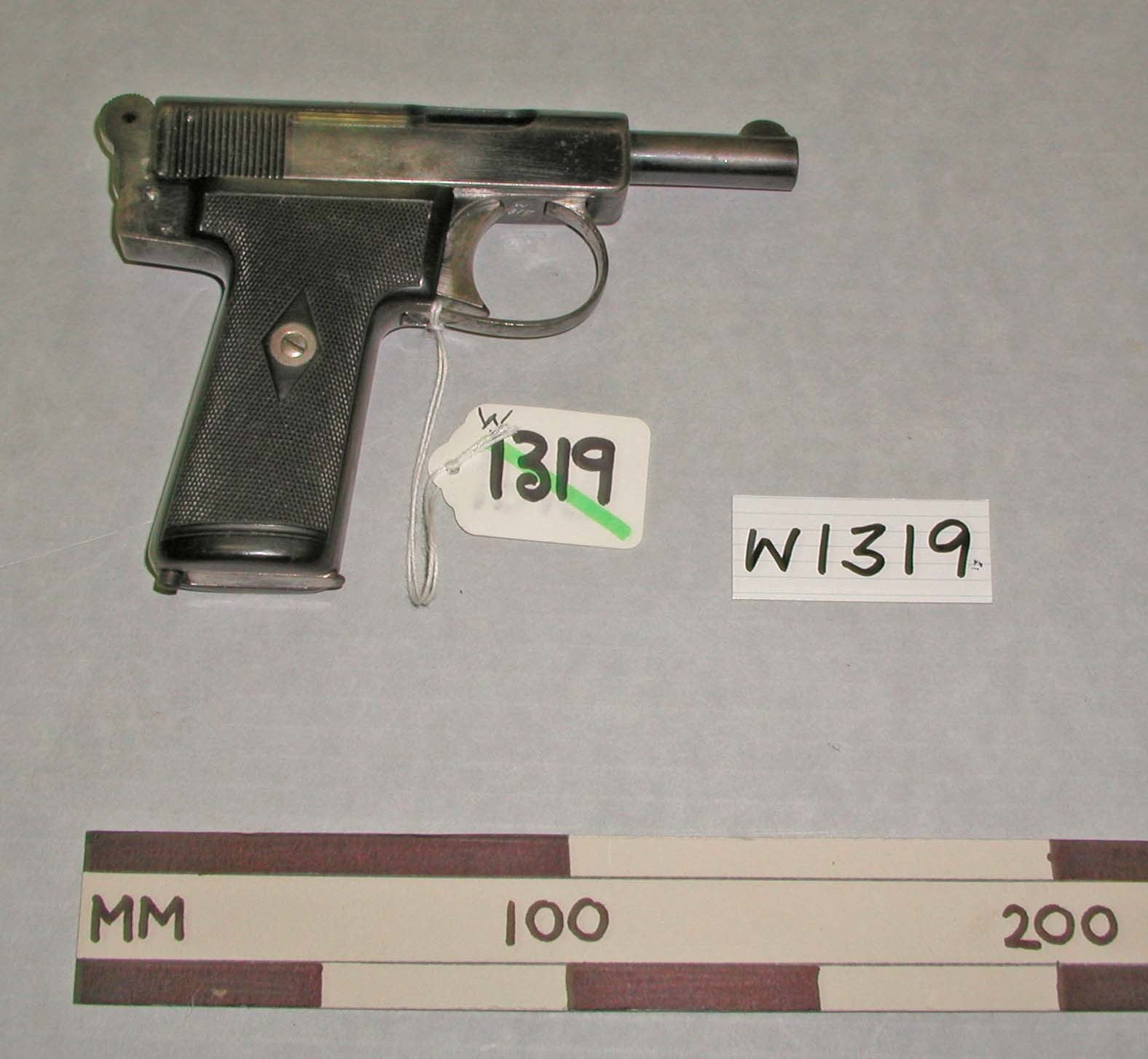
Webley and Scott Model 1911 .32 Automatic Pistol

Webley began experimenting with semi-automatic action in 1900 and in 1909 they began producing a series of semi-automatic pistols for civilian and police use. Their .32 Automatic Pistol was adopted by London's Metropolitan Police in 1911. The same weapon in .38 calibre was used by the Royal Navy as a substitute standard weapon during World War II. The Ordnance Factory Board of India still manufactures .380 Revolver Mk IIz cartridges, as well as a .32 caliber revolver (also known as IOF Mk1) with 2-inch (51 mm) barrel that is clearly based on the Webley Mk IV .38 service pistol.

In 1924 Webley produced its first air pistol, the Mark I.

In 1929 Webley introduced its Mark II air rifle. During World War II Webley air rifles were used for rifle training as well as civilian target shooting and hunting.

The Mark II, known as the service air rifle because of its use by the UK military, used break-action with a superimposed barrel locked by bolt action. The detachable barrel was easily interchangeable with others of the three calibres available.

The Mark II was discontinued in 1946 and replaced by the Mark III, in production until 1975. The Mark III was a top-loaded air rifle with a fixed barrel and used underlever cocking. It was only made in .177 and .22 calibres.

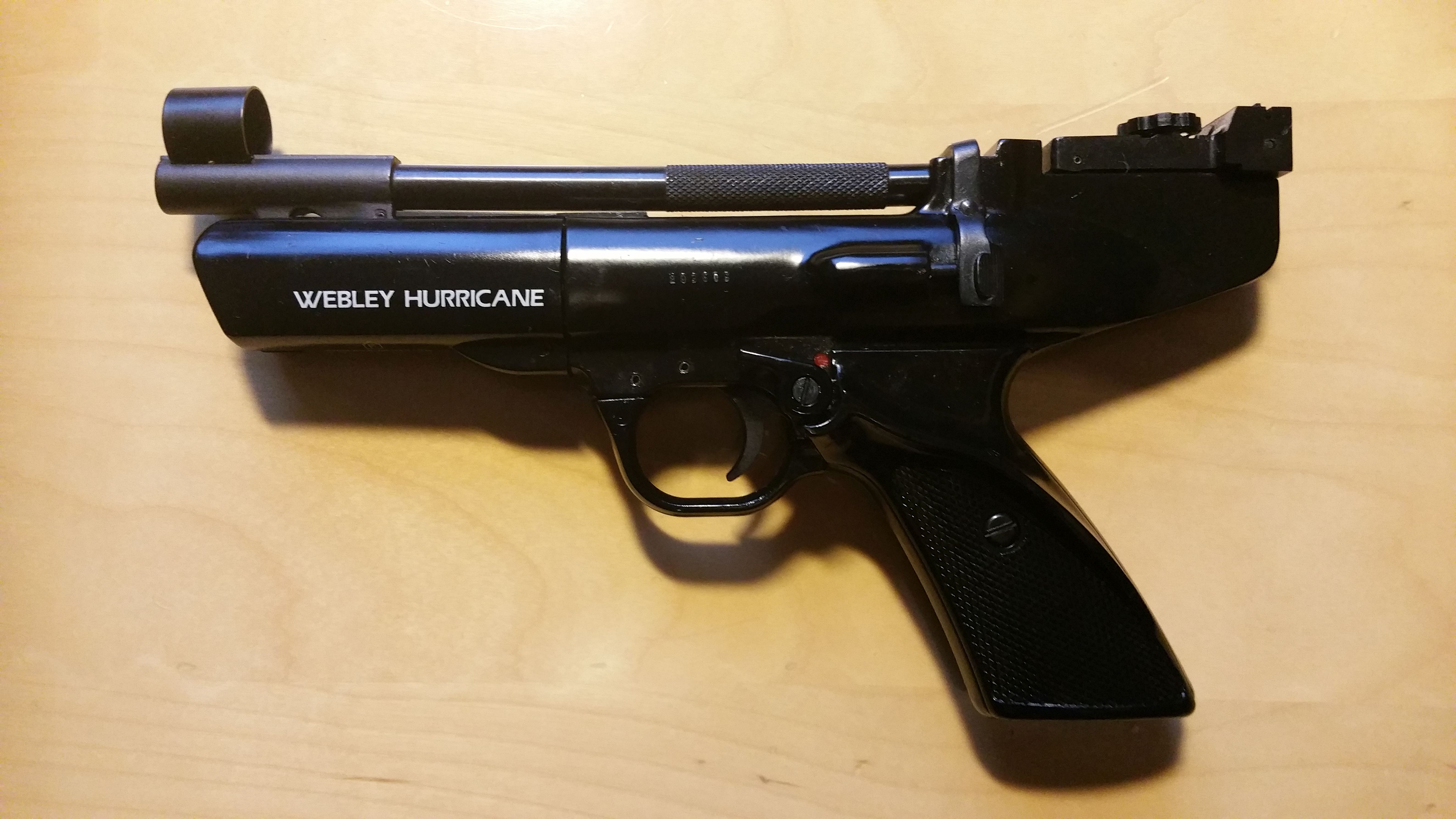
Webley Hurricane .22 air pistol

Webley continues to manufacture air pistols in .22 (5.5 mm) and .177 (4.5 mm) calibre, and air rifles in .22, .177 and .25 (6.35 mm) calibre. A variety of actions were/are available in several different models, including the Hurricane, Nemesis, Stinger and Tempest air pistols and Raider, Venom, and Vulcan air rifles. In early 2007 Webley broke away from its traditional 'barrel overlever' design to launch the revised Typhoon model, a 'break-barrel' design with a recoil-reduction system.

Webley & Scott has also returned to shotgun production with alliances with European manufacturers, and now markets a number of sporting and competition shotguns.

In 2008, Webley sold to Webley (International) Limited but still produces products under the Webley name.

In January 2011 Webley (international) Limited held a creditors meeting Under Section 98 Insolvency Act 1986. On 3 February 2011 liquidators were appointed to wind up the affairs of the company.

According to the Statement of Affairs produced by the Liquidators, Webley (international) owed their unsecured creditors a sum of £164,595.76. They also owed money to one Secured Creditor, Webley Limited (in Liquidation) a sum of £140,000.

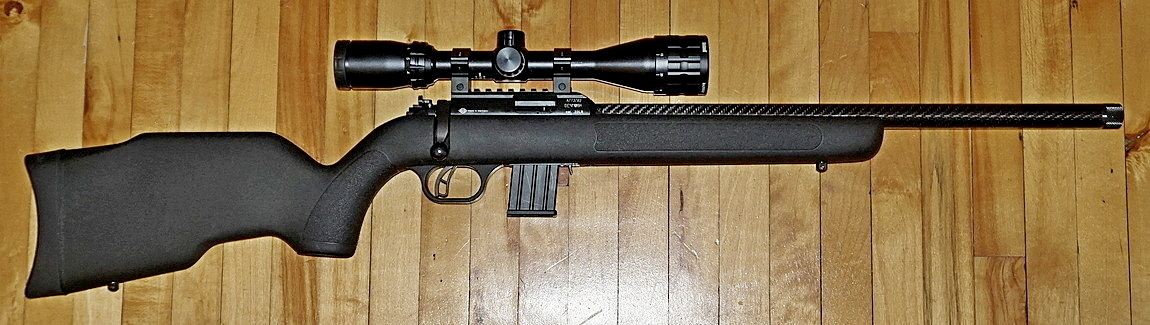
Webley & Scott Xocet rifle carbon fibre .22lr caliber with scope

Webley & Scott was acquired by the Fuller Group in 2012.

In 2016, Webley & Scott launch the 1000 Series and 950 Series shotguns. The Xocet Rimfire Rifle is also launched.

== Webley & Scott automatic pistols ==
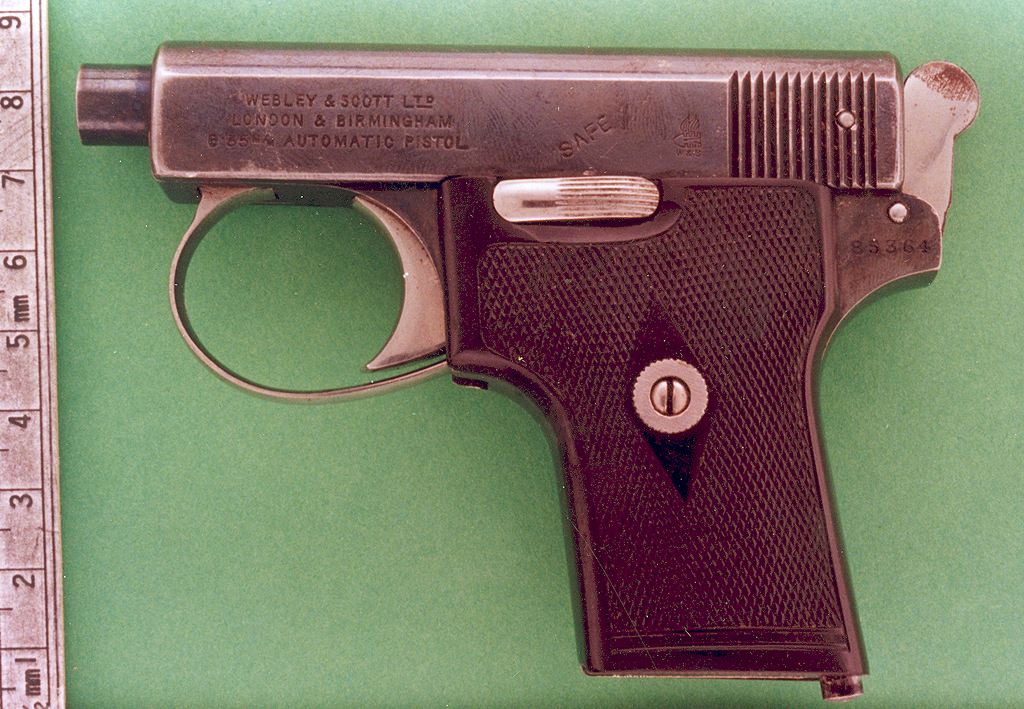
Webley & Scott 1909

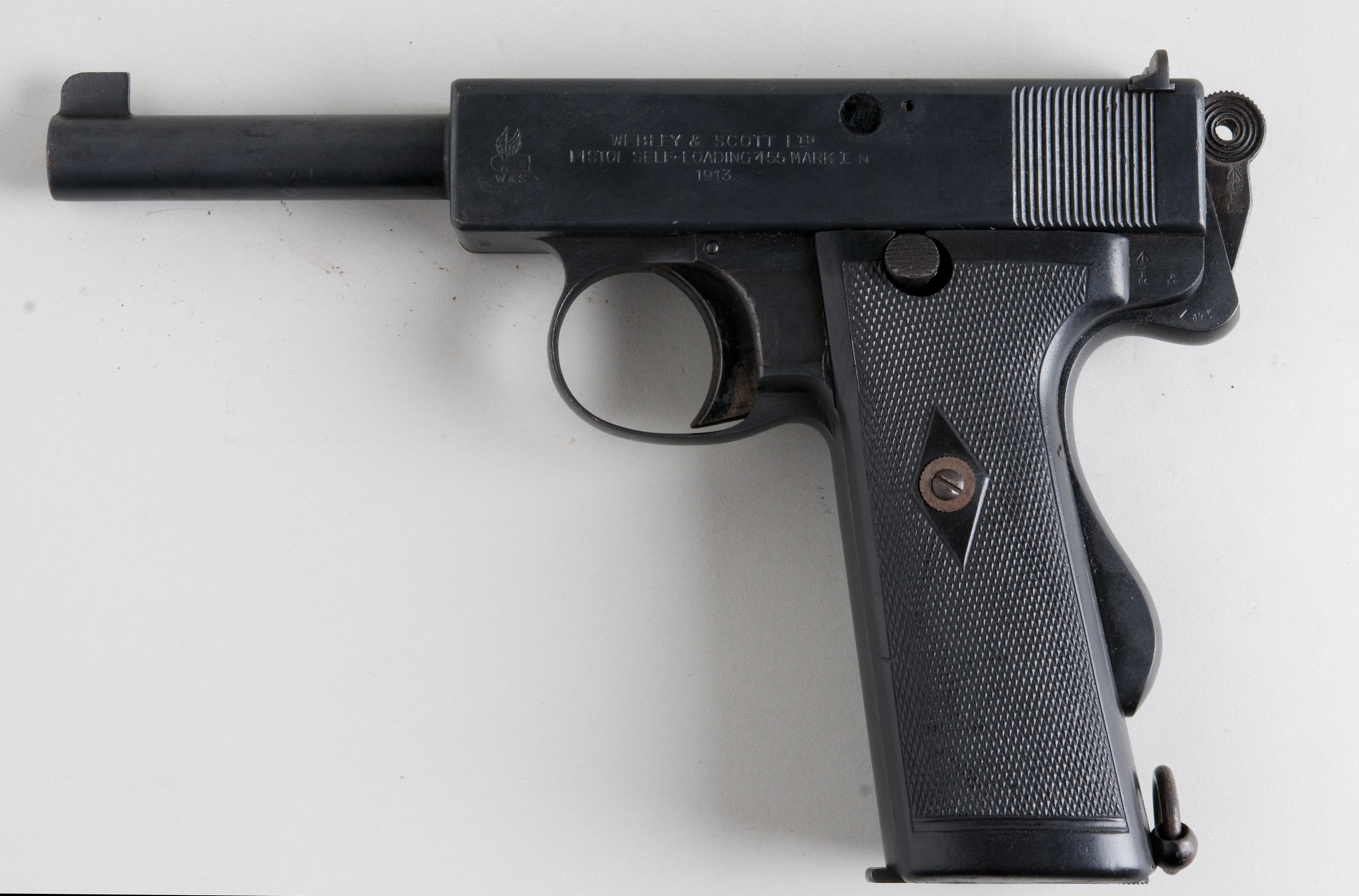
Webley & Scott self-loading .455 inch pistol

Webley's first autoloading pistol was an experimental pistol in .45 calibre produced in 1903; mass production began in 1906 with the .32 ACP (7.65 mm) model. This pistol had a 3.5" barrel and an 8-round magazine. A .25 (6.35 mm) version had a 3-inch barrel and a 6-round magazine. Ultimately pistols were produced in a range of bores from .22 inch to .455 inch, and included 9 mm models. Webley self-loaders were simple, single-action blowback pistols, designed by William Whiting. Production ceased in 1940.

In 1905, Webley had presented an auto-loading pistol for testing by the Small Arms Committee (SAC), a British military group charged with organizing trials and making recommendations of arms to the War Office. The SAC, which had begun testing automatics in 1900, was unimpressed by Webley's offering, preferring foreign automatics including the Colt. However no automatic was recommended over contemporary service revolvers, which were all Webleys at the time, and trials would continue until 1913.

In 1910 Webley offered a new automatic for testing, and in 1911 the Webley self-loading .455-inch Mark I was recommended by both the SAC and the Chief Inspector of Small Arms (CISA.) This pistol was adopted by the Royal Navy in early 1912 as the first automatic pistol officially in British service. Later the pistol was also adopted by the Royal Horse Artillery and was issued to members of the Royal Flying Corps.

The Webley & Scott self-loading .455 inch pistol had a 7-round magazine. It was not a small pistol, rugged and accurate at short range, but also heavy with an awkward grip angle. It was prone to jamming throughout most of its service career, owing largely to its cordite ammunition, which left residue that fouled the close tolerances of its diagonally locking breech. The problem was officially resolved in 1941 with the introduction of the Mark Iz (nitrocellulose) cartridge.

The first examples of the pistol had the safety on left side of the hammer, but later models moved the safety to the left side of the frame, where it could also lock the slide. A grip safety was provided on the military models. The pistol had dual ejectors. The slide stop was activated by the absence of a cartridge in the feedway, not by the magazine follower as in most automatics. A drift-adjustable rear sight had range-hashmarks in micrometers.

Although never officially adopted by the British Army, Webley self-loaders were widely used as a substitute-standard or personal weapons by British and Commonwealth forces in both World Wars. Versions were also marketed to colonial military and police forces and were widely adopted.

The 1906 Webley & Scott Self Loading Pistol in .32 ACP was adopted by the London Metropolitan Police in 1911, and is sometimes referred to as the Webley MP for this reason. It officially replaced the bulldog revolvers then in use following the infamous Siege of Sidney Street in 1911.

== Webley & Scott flare pistols ==
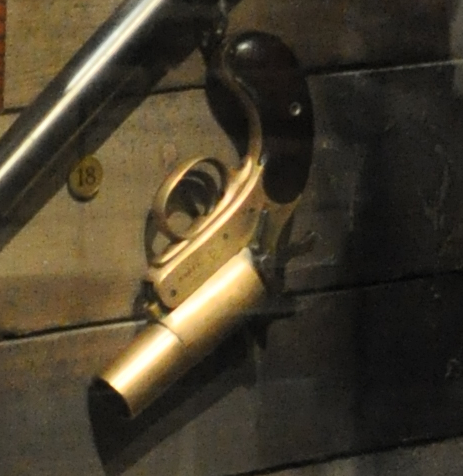
No.1 Mk 1 flare pistol on display at the National Firearms Museum

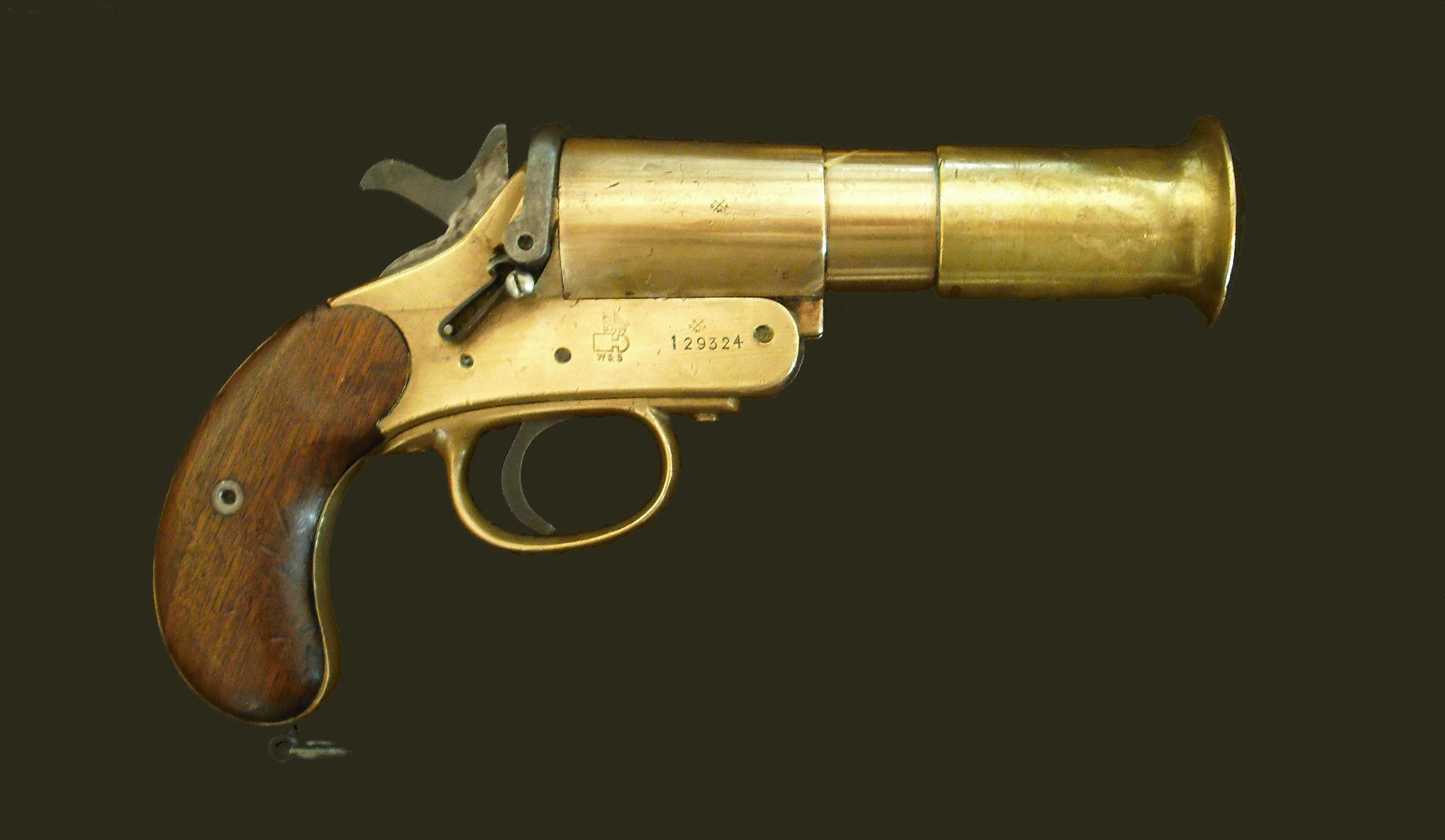
1918 MkIII flare pistol

Webley & Scott produced a number of single-shot, break open signal flare gun devices used by Commonwealth Military Forces during the First and Second World Wars. The most prolific of these was the No.1 MkIII, produced in 1918 at the company's Birmingham facility. A variant, differing only in its use of black plastic grip panels instead of the earlier wood, was produced by Colonial Sugar Refinery in Sydney, Australia in 1942. Perhaps the most famous example of a No.1 Mk 1 flare pistol is in the collection at the Conception Bay Museum, Harbour Grace, NL. The gun was lent by Edward Langdon Oke, IV, a veteran of WW1 and the then editor of the Harbor Grace Standard newspaper, to the first Canadian to make a transatlantic flight, Capt. J. Errol Boyd (1891–1960). Boyd took off 9 Oct 1930 from the Harbour Grace airstrip in the plane Maple Leaf (aka, Columbia), navigated by Lieut. Harry Connor, and landed 10 Oct in Tresco, Scilly Isles, England. The gun was engraved to mark the historic flight and is also tatted with the owner's initials. The company logo is that of a bird wing with the tips angling left and W+S underneath and the gun is stamped 7648.

== Notable designs ==
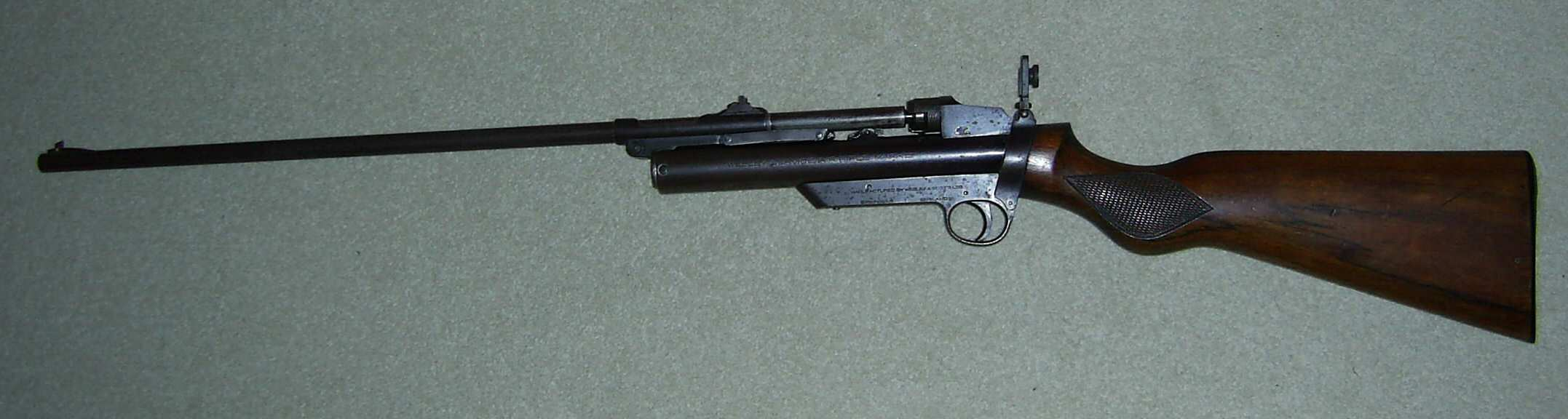
Webley Mk II Service air rifle

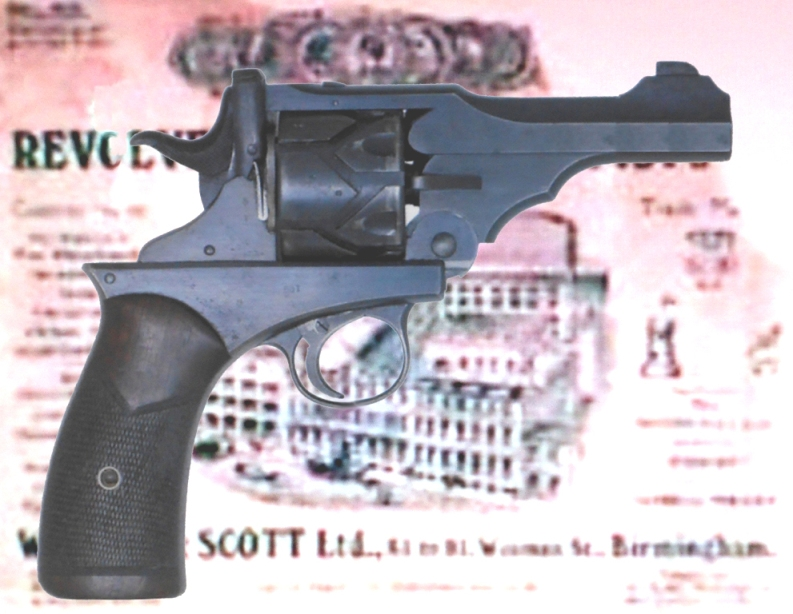
Webley-Fosbery, short-barrel variant, automatic revolver

- The Webley Longspur revolver (1853)
- The Royal Irish Constabulary Revolver (1867)
- The Boxer Revolver (1868)
- The British Bull Dog revolver (1872)

Developed from the RIC Revolver, with a barrel only 2½ inches long, it can fit in a coat pocket.

- The Webley Revolver Marks I - VI, (1887 to 1923)

Sold commercially as the "Webley-Government"

- The Webley-Wilkinson (1884 to 1914)

A revolver manufactured by Webley, sold by Wilkinson Sword company

- The Mars Automatic Pistol (1900)
- The Webley-Fosbery Automatic Revolver (1900)
- The Webley Self-Loading Pistol (1910)
- The Webley Mark I Air Pistol (1924)
- The Webley Mark II Air Rifle (1929)
- The Webley Mark III Air Rifle
- The Webley Hawk Mark III Air Rifle (1977)
- The Webley Hurricane Air Pistol (1977)
- The model 100 single barrel shotgun
- The model 400, 500 & 700 boxlock shotguns

== Webley & Scott in India ==
As part of the Make in India initiative launched in 2014, Webley & Scott began to manufacture its revolvers in India in collaboration with an Indian firm at their Sandila factory, Hardoi district, Uttar Pradesh. The company has also decided to open two shooting ranges in Gorakhpur and Kanpur. In 2020, they began production of weapons for the Indian civilian market, including the Webley Mk IV, and the WP20, a newly built .32 Auto semi-automatic pistol.

== See also ==
- Gun Quarter, Birmingham
- Revolver
- Automatic revolver
- Handgun
- Pistol
- Antique firearms
