= Charles-François Galand =

French gunsmith (1832–1900)

- Company type: Private
- Industry: Firearms, mostly small revolvers
- Founded: 1800s in Liège, Belgium
- Founder: Charles-François Galand
- Defunct: 1942
- Fate: Dissolved
- Headquarters: Paris, France
- Area served: France
- Key people: René Galand

Charles-François Galand (1832–1900) was a French gunsmith who worked in Liège, Belgium, and Paris, France. He manufactured many revolvers for civilian and military use, including the Galand Revolver (also called the Galand-Sommerville or Galand-Perrin), the Tue Tue, and the tiny Le Novo. The Velo-dog, developed from the Tue Tue and the Novo, was designed by Charles-François' son René in 1904.

== Galand Revolvers ==
=== Galand Model 1868 ===
The original Galand revolver was a double-action, open frame (no strap across the top of the cylinder) revolver patented in 1868. Military versions were produced in 9 mm while civilian versions were made in 12 mm. The gun is easily recognizable due to its long extraction lever, which stretches under the gun to form the trigger guard. Pulling the lever forward separates the barrel and cylinder from the rest of the gun. At the same time the extractor plate is blocked which catches any cartridges in the cylinder, thereby extracting them.

Galand revolver 1868 pattern, on display at Musée de l'Armée
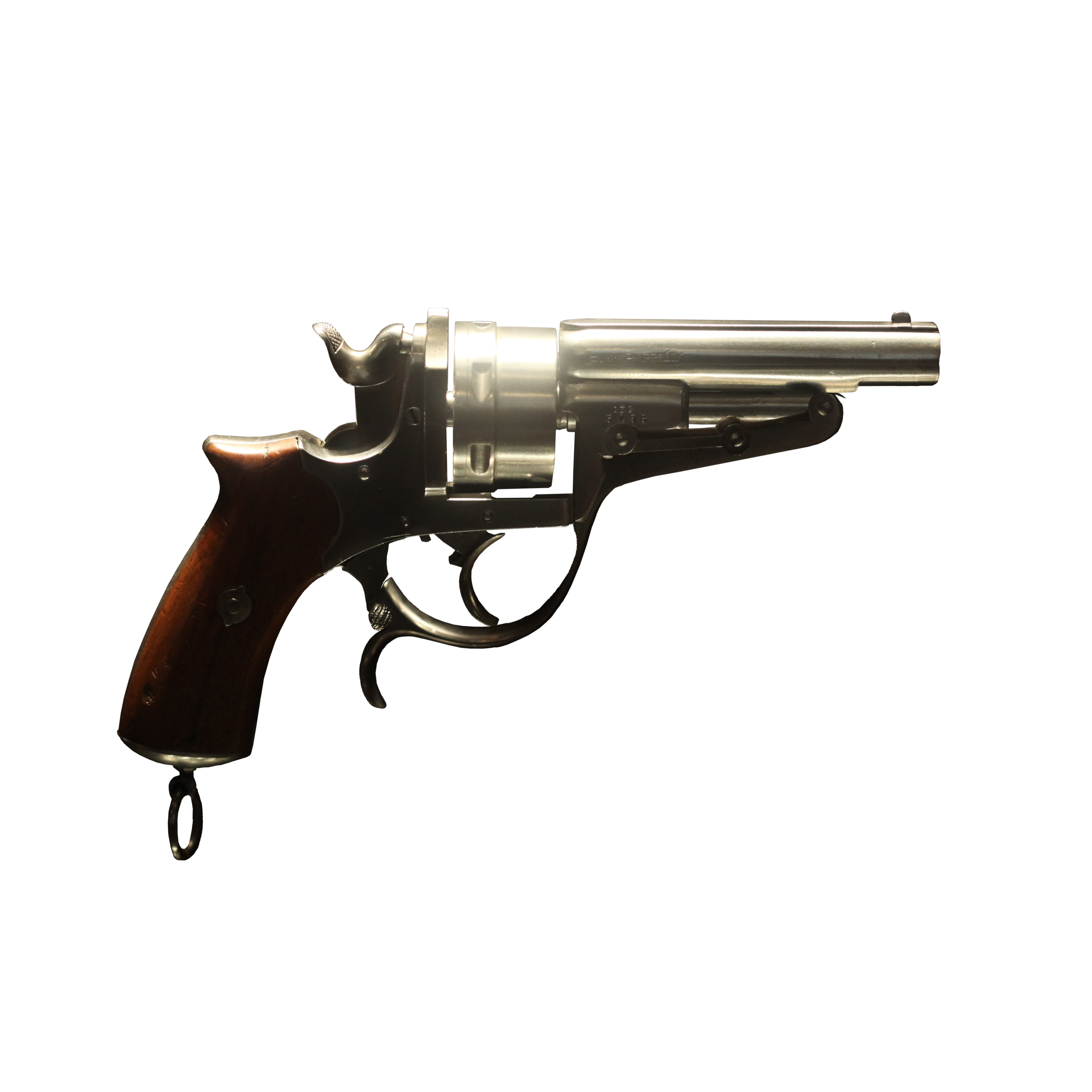

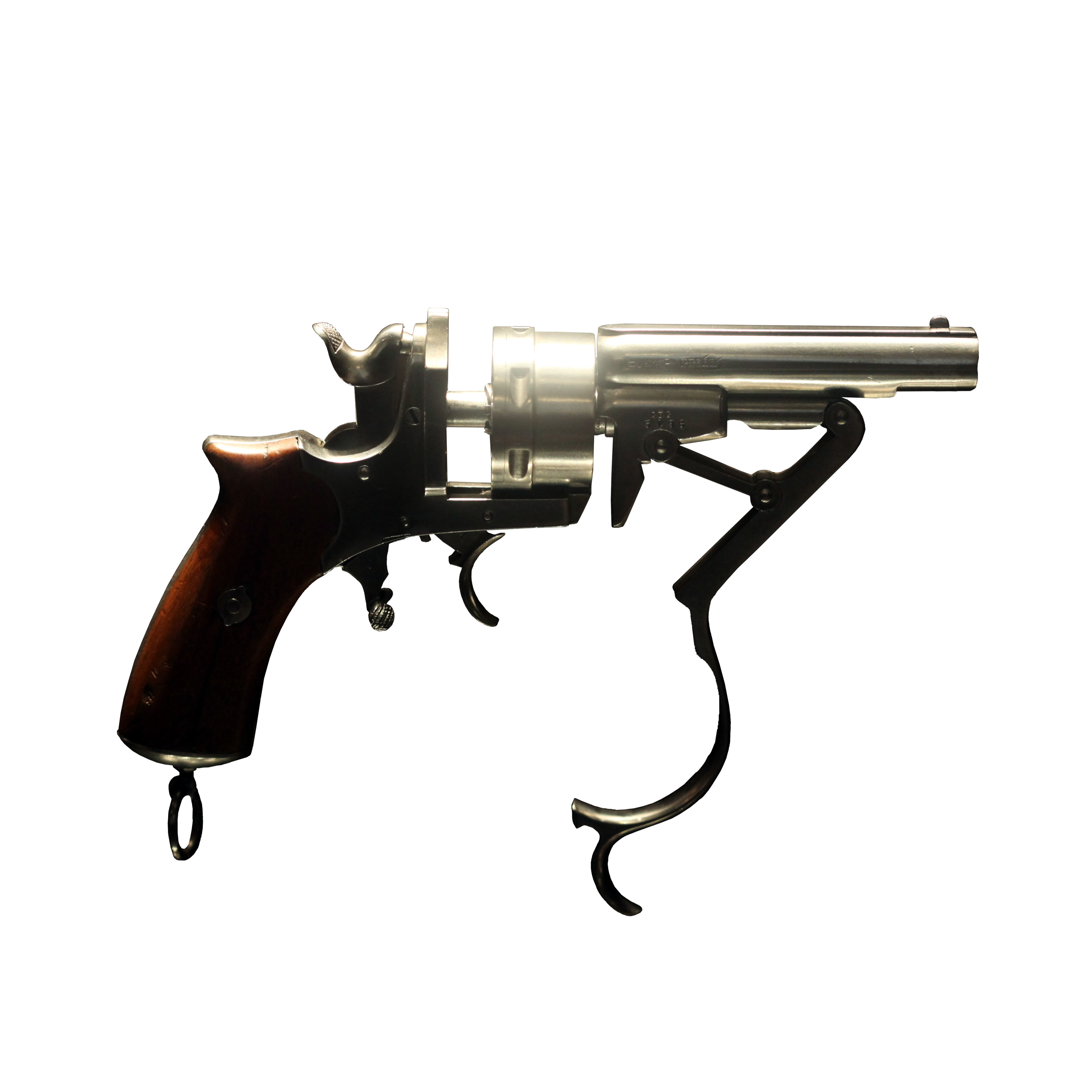

The first model was manufactured both in Liège and in Birmingham, England by the British arms firm Braendlin and Sommerville, and is therefore sometimes referred to as the Galand-Sommerville. Sommerville shared the patent for the case extracting system with Galand. The Galand-Perrin is an identical model which uses the Perrin cartridge (7 mm, 9 mm, and most famously 12 mm).

The Galand's double-action mechanism allowed for rapid firing but the longer trigger pull made this less accurate than single-action fire. The Galand's self-extracting system made loading the revolver much faster than contemporary gate-loaded pistols such as the Colt Peacemaker.

First distributed in October 1868, the Galand revolver sold briskly in France, at least in part due to fears over the looming Franco-Prussian War of 1870.

Despite France's loss to the Germans the Galand performed successfully and the Imperial Russian Navy adopted the Galand model 1870 revolver in 1871. This revolver was manufactured under contract by Nagant and Goltiakoff in Russia in 1878. The Romanian Army also adopted the Galand.

=== Tue Tue and Le Novo ===
In 1872 Galand improved the design with a closed frame, but failed to win a French military contract and began aiming most of his production at the civilian market. In 1893 Galand introduced the 8 mm Tue Tue (kill kill) hammerless pocket revolver, which continued in production until about 1935. Later versions were also sold in .32 S&W and .38 ACP, and some had an external hammer. The tiny Le Novo revolver, with a hinged trigger and no trigger guard, also featured a folding grip.

=== Velodog revolver ===
After Charles-François Galand's death in 1900 his son, René, continued the business until 1942. He created the Velo-dog, a truly peculiar conceit in personal defence weapons. The name is a contraction of vélocipède (bicycle) and dog. The weapon was originally marketed as a defence for bicyclists during the bicycle craze which started at the end of the 19th century. Like the Le Novo the Velodog originally used a 5.5 mm centerfire cartridge; it was also available in .22 caliber and 6.35 mm.

== Literature ==
- Myatt, Major Frederick (1981). An Illustrated Guide to Pistols and Revolvers. London: Salamander Books Limited. pp. 53–55. ISBN 0861010973.
- Zhuk, A.B. (1995). Walter, John (ed.). The illustrated encyclopedia of HANDGUNS, pistols and revolvers of the world, 1870 to 1995. Translated by Bobrov, N.N. London: Greenhill Books. pp. 52–53. ISBN 1-85367-187-8.

== See also ==
- Revolver
- Handgun
- Pistol
