= Worshipful Company of Gunmakers =

Livery company of the City of London

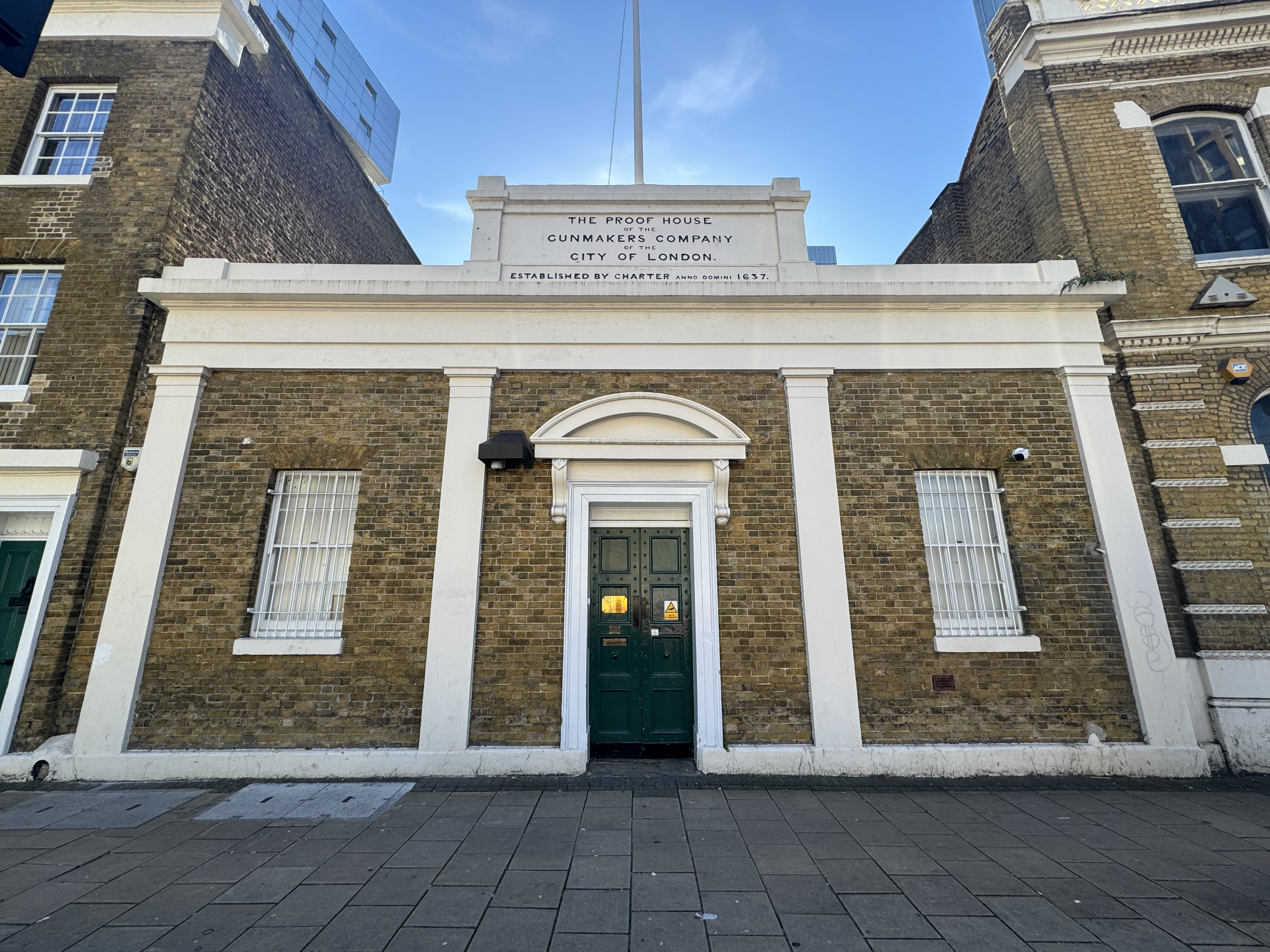
- Motto: Probis Civibus Canones Probentur ("May cannons be proved for honest citizens")
- Location: The Proof House, Whitechapel, London, England
- Date of formation: 14 March 1637; 389 years ago
- Company association: Gunmakers
- Order of precedence: 73rd
- Master of company: Mrs Nicole Brocklebank-Fowler
- Website: www.gunmakers.org

The Worshipful Company of Gunmakers, formally the 'Society of the Mistery of Gunmakers of the City of London', is one of the 114 livery companies of the City of London. It is one of very few livery companies still exercising powers in its traditional area of influence, and to this day plays a regulatory role in overseeing the work of the Proof House. The Company also has charitable aims, and established The Gunmakers Trust in 2003 with "the principle aim of supporting the craft skills associated with traditional gunmaking".

The Gunmakers' Company is one of the 'ancient livery companies' and ranks seventy-third in the order of precedence of the livery companies. The Company's motto is Probis Civibus Canones Probentur ("May guns be proved for honest citizens").

== History ==
The Gunmakers' Company received its royal charter of incorporation in 1637, during the reign of King Charles I. Under the provisions of this charter, the Company has performed statutory duties to regulate the safety of firearms in the United Kingdom for nearly 400 years. To this end, the Company was given broad powers of "search view gage proof trial and markings" of firearms. The Proof House continues to prove guns on a daily basis, and the power to search (with a police constable) for unproved guns and seize them is still vested in the Company today. The charter also granted the Company their proof mark, the letters 'GP' crowned, which remains in use to this day.

The first proof house was built in 1657 and located near the Tower of London in Aldgate on land owned by John Silke. Since 1675, the company has been located at the Proof House (commercially known as 'The London Proof House Limited') on Commercial Road, just east (outside) of Aldgate and the old City walls, in Whitechapel. It is unique amongst livery companies for having always been located outside the City Wall.

== See also ==
- Birmingham Proof House
