= Webley Self-Loading Pistol =

Type of semi-automatic pistol

Webley Self-Loading Pistol Mk. 1
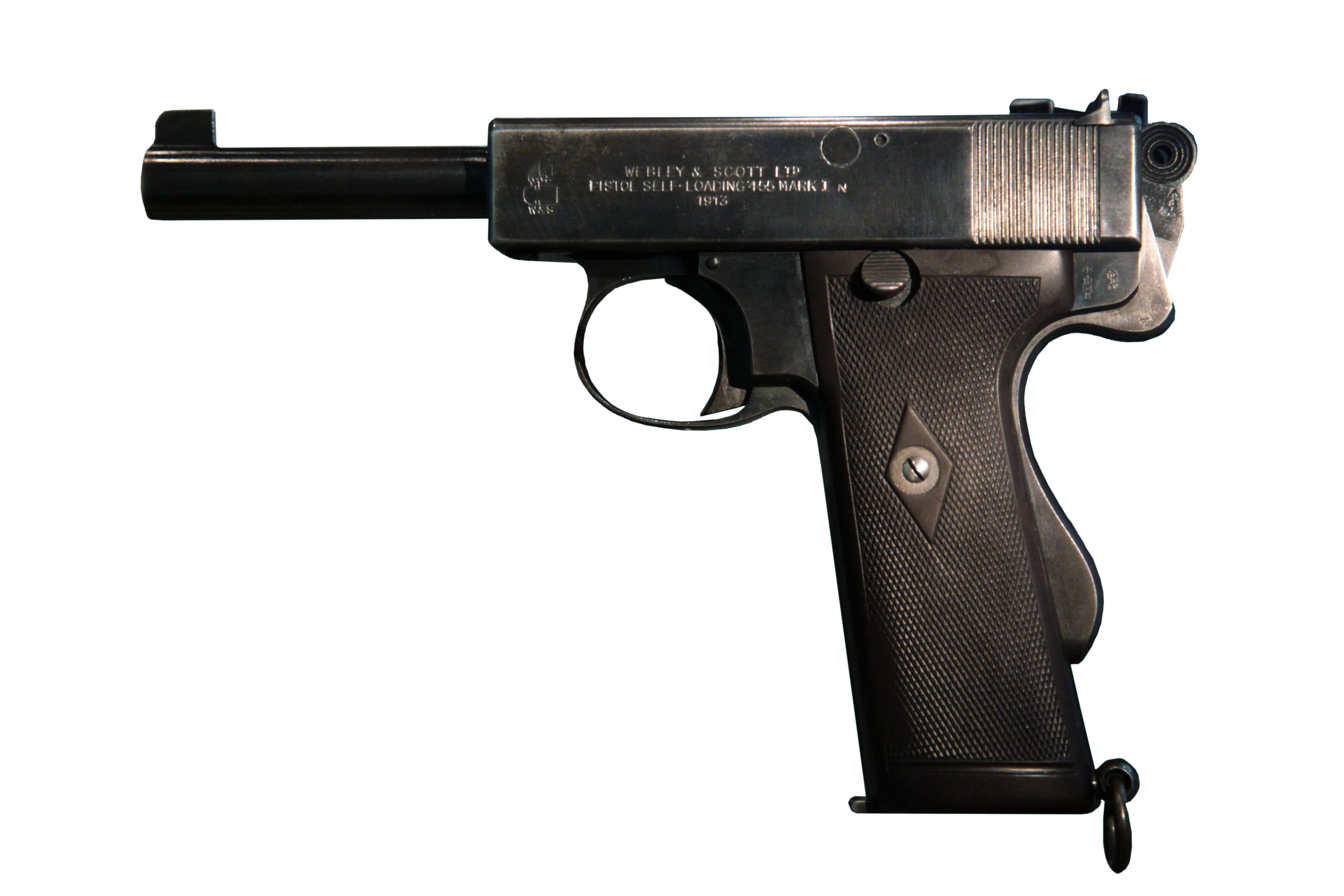
- Webley-Scott automatic pistol
- Type: Semi-automatic pistol
- Place of origin: United Kingdom

Service history
- In service: 1910–1942
- Used by: United Kingdom
- Wars: World War I World War II

Production history
- Designer: Webley & Scott
- Designed: 1910
- Manufacturer: Webley & Scott
- Produced: 1910–1932

Specifications
- Mass: 1.13 kilograms (2.5 lb)
- Length: 216 millimetres (8.5 in)
- Barrel length: 127 millimetres (5.0 in)
- Cartridge: .455 Webley Auto, .32 ACP
- Caliber: .455 in (11.55 mm)
- Action: Short recoil
- Muzzle velocity: 236 metres per second (770 ft/s)
- Feed system: 7-round detachable box magazine

The Webley Self-Loading Pistol was an early magazine-fed pistol. The gun was designed in 1910 by the Webley & Scott company. The Mk. 1 entered police service in 1911 in a .32 ACP model for the London Metropolitan Police. The .455 version was adopted by the Royal Navy in 1912 as the first automatic pistol in British service. The pistol was also adopted by the Royal Horse Artillery and the Royal Flying Corps. Its predecessor was the unsuccessful Mars Automatic Pistol.

== Service use ==
They were issued to pilots of the Royal Naval Air Service. While principally issued as sidearms there was some intent that they be used to shoot other planes.

== Problems ==
The pistol's original cordite cartridge left a lot of residue in the barrel causing frequent jamming. This was resolved in 1914 with nitrocellulose instead of cordite in the .455 cartridge. This new cartridge for the Mk.1 was called the Mark Iz.

Had Webley invested in more research and development of its pistol and ammunition and new technologies, the result would have been a better firearm produced more quickly. Particularly given the increasing adoption of the semi-automatic pistol by foreign armed forces and the extensive testing and development data available from previous efforts by other manufacturers.

== Improvements and variations ==
The first models of the Mk. 1 had the safety on left side of the hammer. This was later moved to the left side of the frame, where it could lock the slide. Service versions were also outfitted with a grip safety.
