= Gun Quarter =

Historic district of Birmingham, England

Coordinates: 52.48448°N 1.89688°W

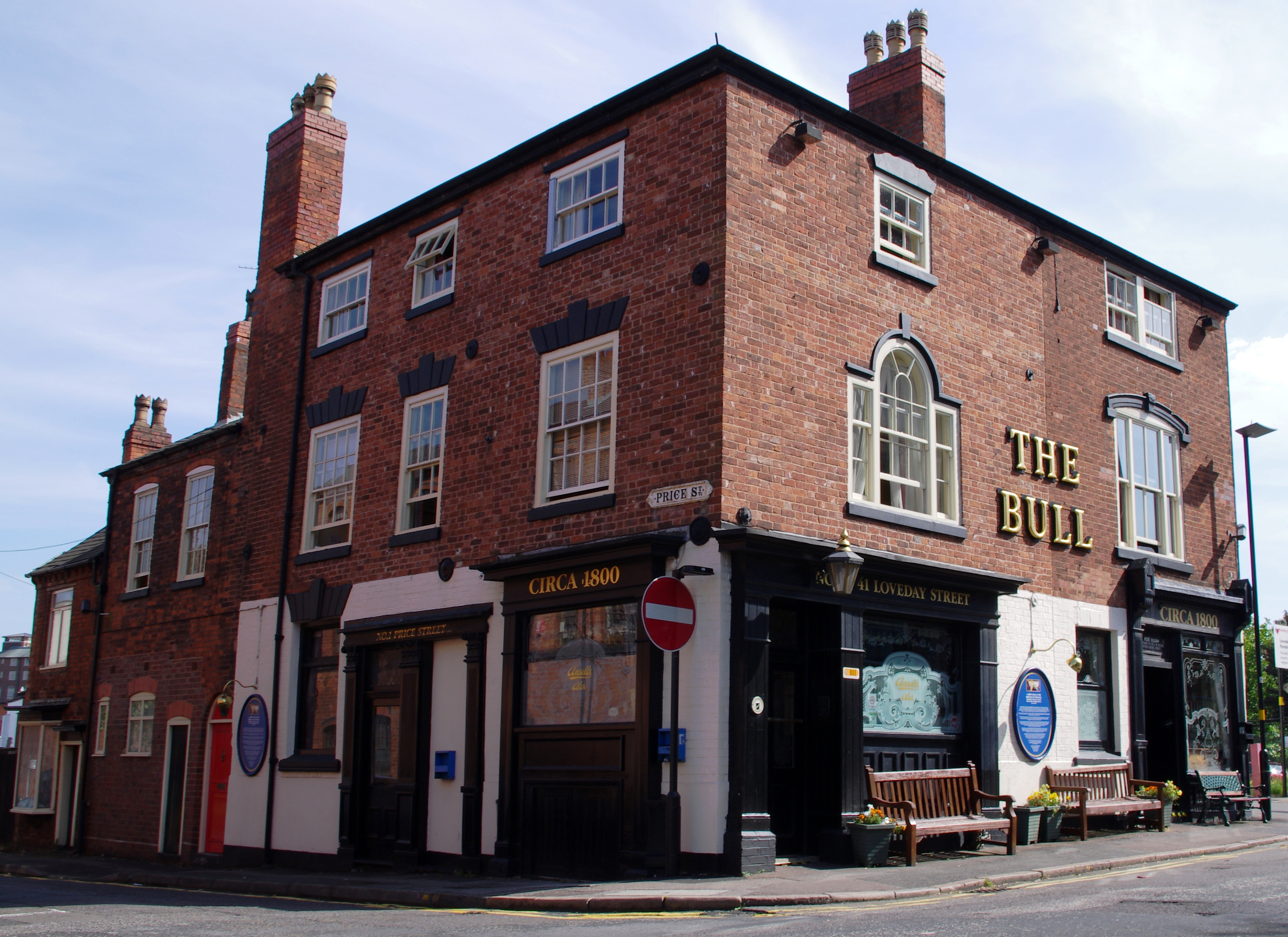
The Bull pub still stands today; in the mid-19th century it was where gun workers were paid their wages

The Gun Quarter is a district of the city of Birmingham, England, which was for many years a centre of the world's gun-manufacturing industry, specialising in the production of military firearms and sporting guns. It is an industrial area to the north of the city centre, bounded by Steelhouse Lane, Shadwell Street and Loveday Street.

The first recorded gun maker in Birmingham was in 1630, and locally made muskets were used in the English Civil War. By the 1690s Birmingham artisans were supplying guns for William III to equip the English Army (and successor British Army after 1707). The importance of the trade to the town grew rapidly throughout the 18th century, with large numbers of guns produced for the slave trade. The 19th century saw further expansion, with the Quarter meeting the demand for the Napoleonic Wars, Crimean War, American Civil War and the British Empire. During both the First and Second World Wars the area played a major role in the manufacture of small arms for the British Armed Forces.

After the First World War demand fell; the need for skilled, specialised labour fell as the market became flooded with cheaper, machine-made guns, and gun manufacturing in the area began a slow decline. In the 1960s, a large part of the Gun Quarter was demolished by post-war town planners, with the area split in two by the construction of the Birmingham Inner Ring Road.

Following the Big City Plan of 2008, the Gun Quarter is now a district within Birmingham City Centre. Many buildings in the area are disused but plans are in place for redevelopment including in Shadwell Street and Vesey Street.

== History ==
=== Context: Why Gun manufacturing? ===
Birmingham became the capital of global trade in arms because Britain had been involved in multiple wars since the 17th century. Britain's involvement caused a constant demand for wartime supplies, specifically in gun manufacturing. The British empire expanded tremendously between the 1600s and 1900s; naturally, this resulted in an increased demand for gun manufacturing so they could expand, keep control, and quell any disturbances in the colonies. The number of guns produced increased; in the 18th century, at the start of the industrial revolution, it was around "tens of thousands". However, by the 19th century, it was around a few million.

=== 17th century ===
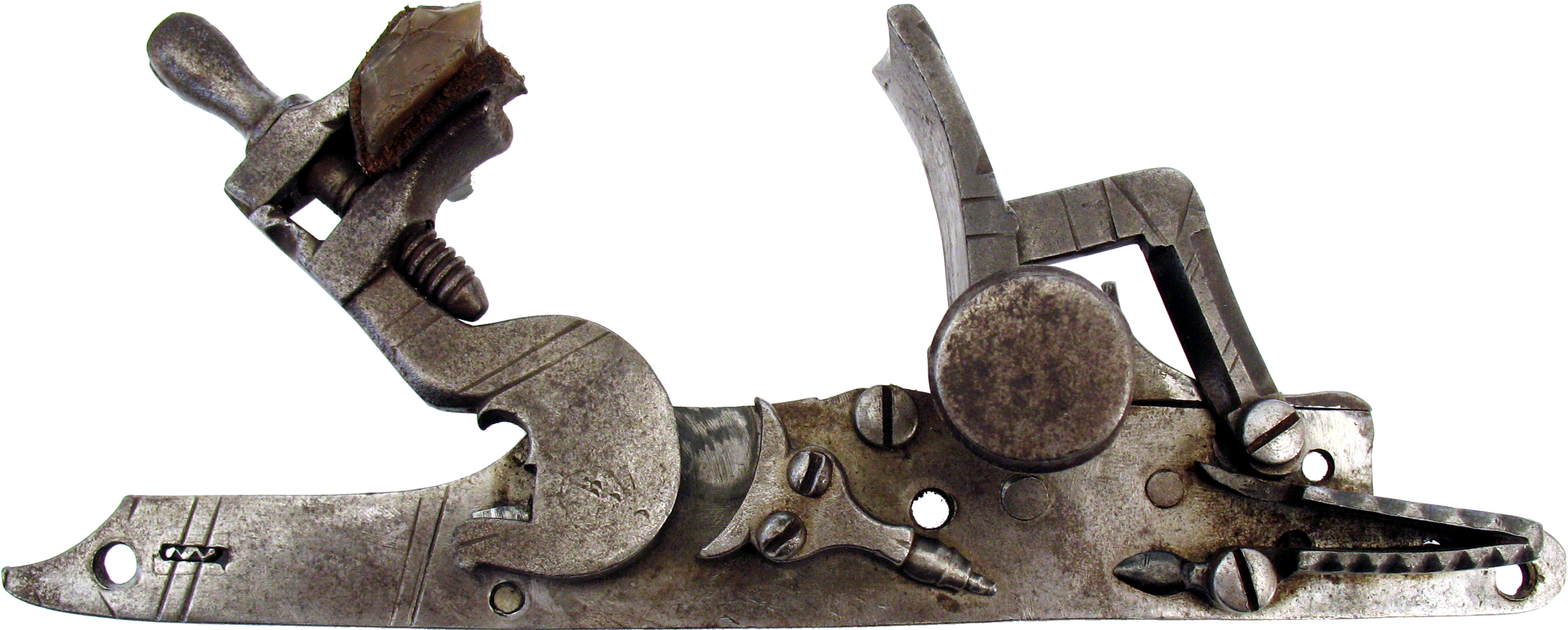
External view of a cocked 17th century snaphance lock on musket, a weapon Birmingham was selling to London.

During the early to mid-17th century Birmingham's population numbered only several thousand; the town was home to many foundries and workshops that made a wide variety of metalware, including guns. Sir Richard Newdigate, one of the new, local Newdigate Baronets, approached manufacturers in the town in 1689 with the notion of supplying the British Government with small arms. It was stressed that they would need to be of high enough calibre to equal the small arms that were imported from abroad. After a successful trial order in 1692, the Government placed its first contract. On 5 January 1693, the "Officers of Ordnance" chose five local firearms manufacturers to initially produce 200 "snaphance musquets" per month over the period of one year, paying 17 shillings per musket, plus 3 shillings per hundredweight for delivery to London.

=== 18th century ===
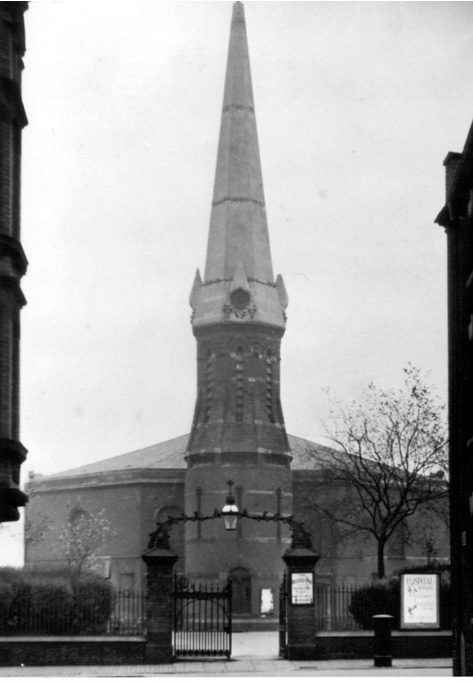
St Mary's Chapel in Whittall Street was a focal point of the area. It was demolished in 1920s to make room for the expansion of the General Hospital in Steelhouse Lane.

At the start of the 18th century, gun manufacture was concentrated in the Digbeth area, but fifty years later the trade had moved to the present-day Gun Quarter. Many of the gunsmiths also expanded to less cramped parts of the city – the Gun Quarter is a very small area, and early accounts describe many "higgledy piggledy" houses and factories with different gunshops and gunsmiths residing in close proximity to one another. A commemorative plaque in the Gun Quarter claims that around this time Birmingham was the "foremost arms producer in the world", the town's closest rival being London.

By the end of the 18th century the Gun Quarter had become a thriving gun-manufacturing community. Government viewing rooms were opened in Bagot Street in 1798, employing sixty or seventy people to ensure that guns produced were of the necessary standard to provide for the British army. Military use, however, was accompanied by a major market in the Atlantic slave trade. A 1788 Parliamentary report counted over 4,000 gun makers, with 100,000 guns a year going to slave traders.

=== 19th century ===
Photograph of the now demolished St Mary's Row, viewed from Loveday Street. W W Greener, Prize Gun Works is on the right.

The British Government began to rely heavily upon the skilled gun manufacturers of the town. The Napoleonic Wars required special efforts, and between 1804 and 1817 a total of 1,827,889 muskets, rifles, carbines, and pistols were manufactured for the Government alone. 3,037,644 barrels and 2,879,203 locks were made and then delivered to London for assembly, and around 1,000,000 items were also delivered to the East India Company, which fought alongside the British forces. It has been estimated that production of guns and components between 1804 and 1815 averaged more than three-quarters of a million items per annum, more than two-thirds of England's production during this period.

Birmingham Proof House was built in 1813, then one of only two such proof houses in England, the other being in London. The building was managed by a consortium of the town's gun traders, its purpose being to ensure that the guns manufactured in the area were safe for use. It is still in use.

The number of firms in Birmingham's gun industry was 125 in 1815, 455 in 1829 (two-thirds of these in the Gun Quarter), and by 1868 there were 578 gun firms in the city. The trade employed 2,867 people in 1851, out of a total of 7,731 in the whole of England and Wales.

"Gun-makers" did not usually manufacture the parts for their guns or even assemble them: in keeping with the traditional nature of Birmingham's manufacturing industries, parts were manufactured by independent specialist sub-contractors and assembled by "fabricators" or "setters-up", the "makers" commissioning and marketing the completed guns. In the late 18th and early 19th century, barrels were mainly manufactured outside the quarter (in Aston, Deritend, Smethwick and West Bromwich), and locks were mainly sourced from the Black Country, but other parts were usually manufactured and assembled within the Quarter. In the late 19th century, Showell's Dictionary of Birmingham listed more than fifty specialist trades involved in gun manufacture, "till late years most of them being carried on under different roofs".

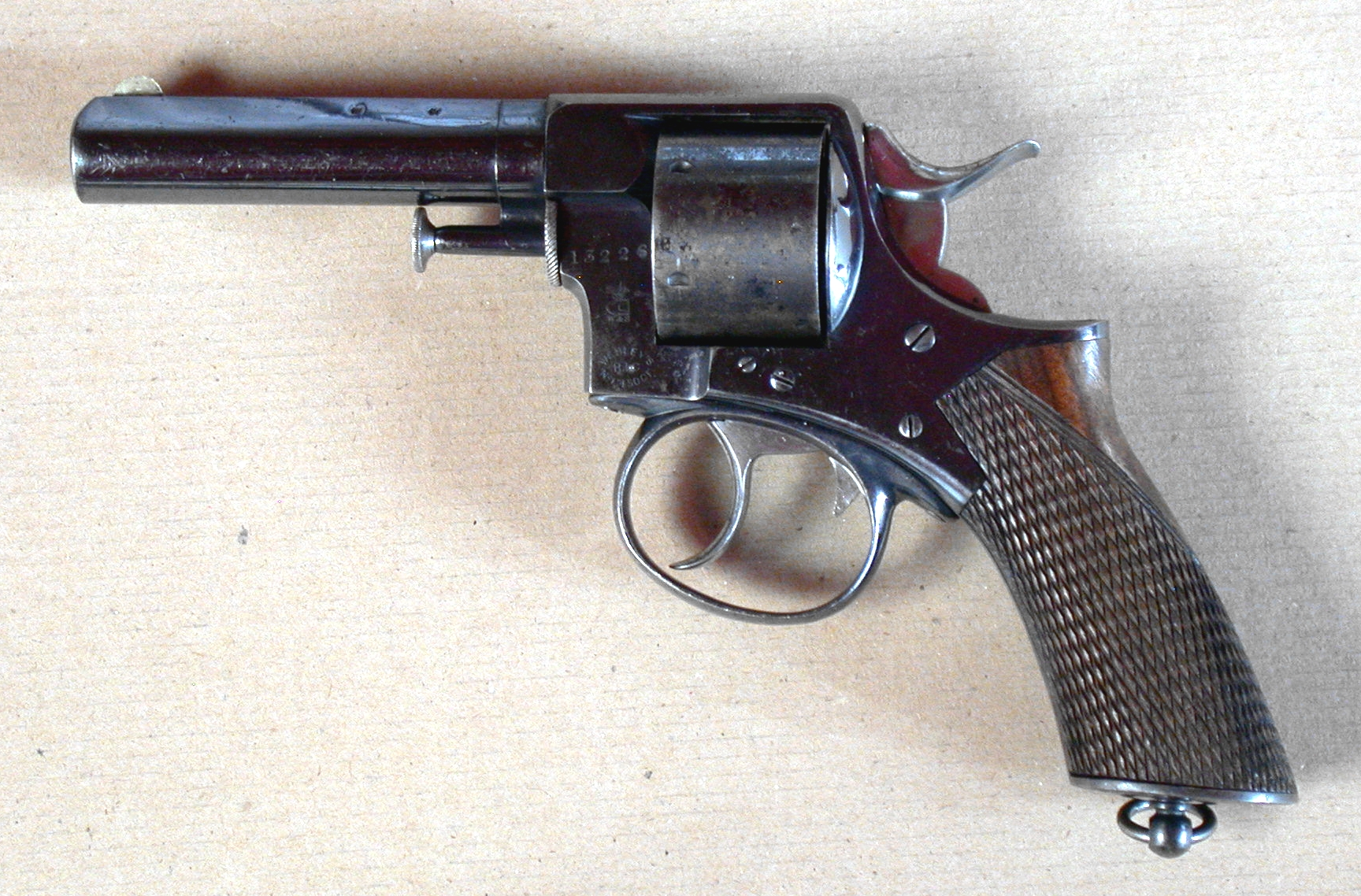
An 1868 Webley & Scott Revolver. Webley's revolvers became the official sidearms of the British Army in 1887

The Crimean War brought much business to the gun makers of Birmingham, and from 1854 to 1864 more than 4,000,000 barrels were proved there. Most military gun stocks were made from walnut, whereas for the cheaper African market common beech was used. During the Crimean War a large saw mill was erected in Turin by a gun maker from the quarter, and nearly a third of a million gun stocks were produced from this source alone.

The Birmingham Small Arms Trade Association had supplied many of the guns during this period, and in 1861 fourteen of these gun smiths formed the Birmingham Small Arms Company (BSA).

It is estimated that around 800,000 weapons were shipped from Birmingham to America during the latter's Civil War. One of the main suppliers was William Tranter, who supplied revolvers to the Confederate forces. General Custer is known to have owned a Galand and Sommerville .44 revolver, which was faster to load than existing American pistols.

By the nineteenth century, the introduction of the percussion system combined with the adoption of modern production methods led to Birmingham becoming the dominant producer in British firearms. A few London makers remained, such as the government-owned Royal Small Arms Factory in Enfield but Birmingham produced the majority of the firearms in Britain. During this time the Gun Quarter made a variety of calibre weapons from high quality to the less elaborate. In general, British weapons were well made, but less decorative than those produced on the continent; above all they earned a reputation for reliability and fine craftsmanship.

=== 20th century ===
The outbreak of World War I saw the Government once again approach Birmingham engineering companies with the prospect of arms manufacture, and within a matter of weeks Birmingham and the Gun Quarter witnessed much preparation for ammunition and gun manufacture. Many of the workers were women due to the enlistment of men into the armed forces.

The increasing mechanisation of gun manufacture in the US and Europe was a significant step in the decline of the Birmingham gun trade, which had for centuries been based on the skilled specialist craftsman. The mass-produced, so-called 'ready made' guns began to flood the market in the 1880s; the number of Brummies employed by the trade fell from 5,500 in 1881 to 4,100 in 1911.

In the 1960s, many of the traditional workshops of the Gun Quarter were demolished by post-war town planners, with the area split in two by the construction of the Birmingham Inner Ring Road. In 1963, a local newspaper, the Sunday Mercury announced the 'Death of Gun Quarter'.

== Modern times ==
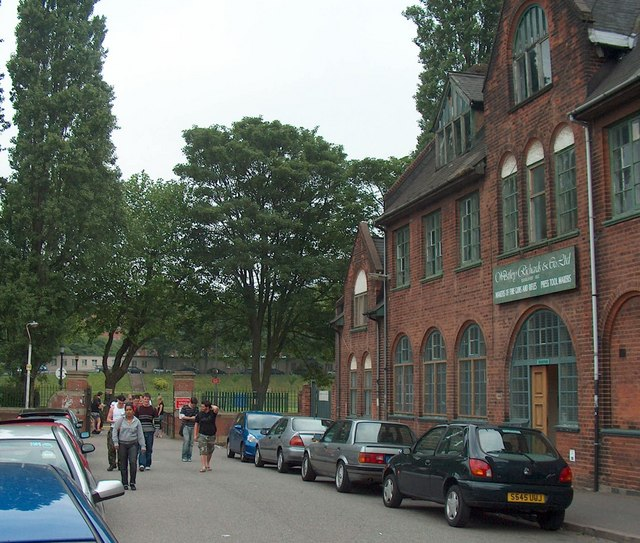
Grange Road, Bournbrook with the works of Westley Richards and Co. Ltd

Today only a small handful of gun manufacturers and traders remain in the Gun Quarter. The last remaining large gun and rifle manufacturer in the area is Westley Richards. Due to the UK's tight laws regarding gun ownership, including sporting arms, there is only a small commercial market for firearms in the country; consequently, the majority of Birmingham's gun manufacture today is of air guns.

The Gun Quarter has continued to decline in the 21st century, losing approximately 25% of its manufacturing jobs in the 3 years from 2003 to 2006, and the trend is continuing, with many vacant and underused buildings.

In August 2011 a controversy was created when the Birmingham Council, in an unwelcome move, decided to change the name of the Gun Quarter. The council had received a petition from 50 residents from a local church group to change the name to St George and St Chad's Quarter. The Birmingham Post reported on it, in response over 4,500 signed a petition not to change the name.

== Gunmakers ==
Hundreds of gunmakers have existed in Birmingham; some of the better-known examples include:

- Joseph Bentley – shared patents with Webley & Scott
- Thomas Bland & Sons – now trading in the USA but still using Birmingham proof for quality assurance
- Braendlin and Sommerville – eventually Galand and Sommerville
- A A Brown & Sons – Founded by Albert Arthur Brown who was the son of John Joseph Brown, a gunmaker who had at one time worked for Webley & Scott, Birmingham Small Arms and W. W. Greener and who ended his working career as resident caretaker with Greener. He founded the firm with his two sons, Albert Henry Brown and Sidney Charles Brown. The company are still trading, with the firm now run by Sidney's son Robin Brown and his son Matthew Brown.
- Thomas Chambers – originally of Bristol, manufactured in Birmingham from 1753 to 1757 at which point he moved to London
- Farmer and Galton – supplied weaponry to the Company of Merchants in Africa as well as the East India Company.
- W. W. Greener – Owned the large Prize Gun Works in Loveday street. The firm are still trading today, making exhibition guns for collectors by David Dryhurst (Greener's last apprentice) and Richard Tandy.
- Thomas Ketland – established in the early 18th century and became one of the largest businesses in the gun quarter
- The Kynoch Gun Factory
- Parker Hale – closed down in 2000
- William Perry – established in 1778, manufactured brass and silver guns, often marking them with a London tag
- Westley Richards – producers of the famous British Lee–Enfield rifles
- E. Roberts – specialised in walking stick shotguns
- William Tranter – founding partner in BSA
- Webley & Scott – pistol and airgun manufacturers

=== Farmer and Galton Gun Manufacturer ===
During the eighteenth century, the Birmingham-based Farmer and Galton Gun Manufacturers produced thousands of firearms which were used by European merchants and African business people in the trade and capture of slaves. In 1702, James Farmer began his gun manufacturing business, and within three decades had secured the investments of Samuel Galton senior (great-grandfather of Sir Francis Galton). Galton eventually took charge of the Birmingham branch of the manufacturers on Steelhouse Lane. Guns were in high demand, a demand that Farmer and Galton aimed to satisfy. Such was the extent of the trade, that Hugh Thomas suggests that by 1765, '150,000 guns had been sent to Africa from Birmingham alone', being traded along with other pieces of hardware, metal or cloth, as the price for a slave. This is a shocking statistic, considering that the population of Birmingham was around 30,000 in 1765, meaning that five times more guns had been sent to Africa than were people in the city. The origins, growth and sales organisation of Farmer and Galton were shaped by the slave trade. Between 1742 and 1760, the firm manufactured the largest part of its output for export; the period immediately before Britain's Industrial Revolution. In the 1750s, they were the chief supplier of arms to the Committee of the Company of Merchants Trading in Africa, enabling the firm to grow rapidly, making it one of the biggest and most successful businesses in Birmingham.

== See also ==
- Birmingham Gun Barrel Proof House: The building contains a museum of arms and ammunition, and can be visited by prior arrangement.
- Gun safety
- Jewellery Quarter - Another historically industrial area of Birmingham
