= Velo-dog =

Revolver

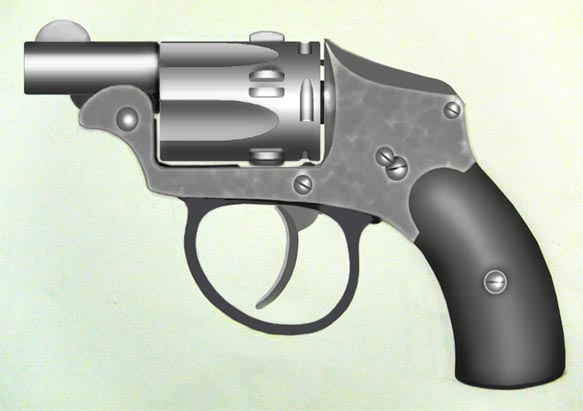
Early model Velo-Dog with trigger guard

A velo-dog (or velodog and also known as a revolver de poche) is a pocket revolver originally created in France by René Galand, son of Charles-François Galand in the late 19th-century and marketed as a defense for cyclists against dog attacks. The name is a compound word from "velocipede" and "dog".

== Design ==
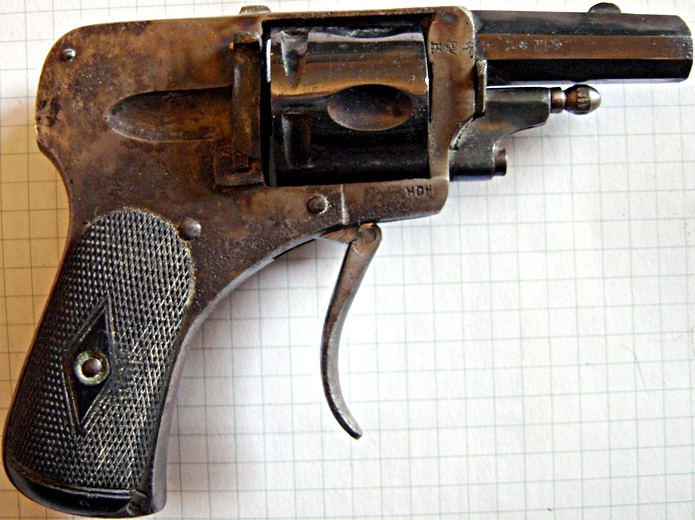
An early 20th century Velo-Dog made by HDH (model name: Lincoln-Bossu).

Surviving examples vary in appearance, but have certain features in common. The hammer is shrouded to avoid its snagging on clothing, so the weapon is double action only.

Another feature of many late-model velo-dogs is the lack of a trigger guard, and a trigger that folds into the body of the weapon when not in use. Common early models have short barrels and fire the 5.75 mm (0.23 in) velo-dog cartridge, although many produced after 1900 are chambered in .25 ACP. Alternative ammunition options existed such as cartridges loaded with cayenne pepper or dust, or bullets made from wax, wood, or cork.

The original revolver uses the Galand company's proprietary 5.75 mm velo-dog cartridge, a centerfire 5.5x29.6mm rimmed cartridge slightly less powerful than the 22 Long Rifle. 5.75mm velo-dog ammunition generally uses a 43 or 45 grain jacketed bullet. The cartridge is still manufactured by Fiocchi.

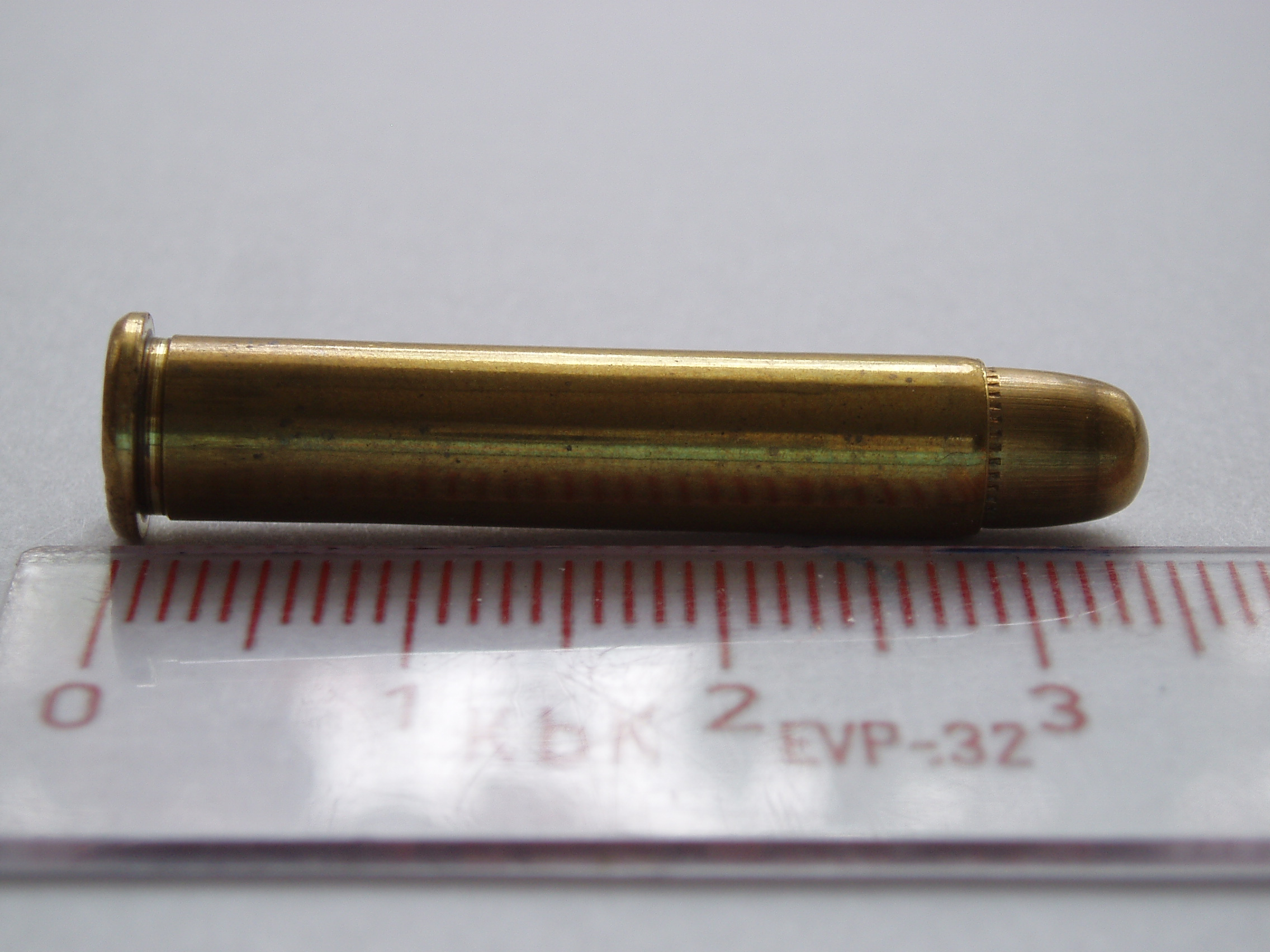
A 5.75 mm velo-dog cartridge

Despite the low energy of the round, a suicide case was recorded where a woman shot herself twice in the temple with a .25 (6.35 mm) velo-dog revolver before succumbing.

== History ==
French manufacturer Galand introduced the first velo-dog in the mid-1890s. Most velo-dogs came from Belgium, Spain, France, or Russia with additional production in Germany, Italy, U.S., and Brazil, with nearly 90 different manufacturers identified. The most prolific production was from the turn of the 20th century to World War I, when a cottage industry sprung up producing velo-dogs of various standards, which quality varied widely. These guns seldom had a manufacturer mark or unique numbers, making identification impossible. Some manufacturers added identifying numbers to exported versions. The Museum of Weaponry in Liège has a very large collection of such guns.

There were over 30 different gun makers in the Eibar region of Spain alone before the Spanish Civil War and since only 4 of them survived there is no way to date individual weapons or distinguish different assembly or batch numbers. Many early gun makers manufactured velo-dog firearms in batches or by the rack, numbering the weapons by batch or rack number which could be mistaken for a serial number. Velo-dogs were cheap to produce and not very expensive to purchase, making unique velo-dogs extremely rare and somewhat valuable.

The attempted assassination of Alfonso XIII in 1913 used a velo-dog.

== See also ==
- Bossu Revolver
