= Thomas Ketland =

Gun manufacturer in Birmingham, England

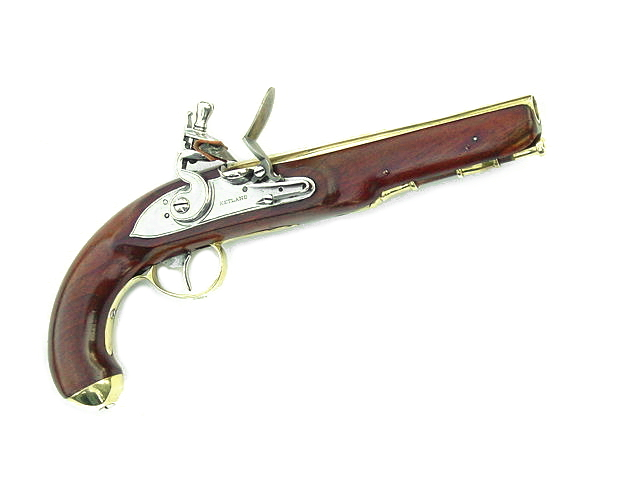
A brass-barreled, flintlock pistol made by Ketland

Thomas Ketland & Co. was a firearms manufacturer founded in Birmingham, England c. 1760. and expanded into the export market around 1790. He died in 1816. The business carried on until bankruptcy in 1821. The company manufactured flintlock pistols, becoming quite successful in its field.

W. Ketland was Thomas Ketland Sr's eldest son. He was originally a partner alongside his father and William Walker. He petitioned to liquidate his part in the company in 1800. The partnership was dissolved in 1801. He died in 1804 but the business carried on to at least 1831. The story about an earlier W. Ketland gunmaker, going back to the 1740s (Gardner says 1715), is not verified. The directory dates are 1808 to 1831 but W. Ketland was trading under that name as early as the middle of 1801 and perhaps as early as the end of 1800. The Philadelphia Ketlands are 2nd son Thomas Jr. and John. Thomas Jr. resided in Philadelphia from 1789 to 1815. John died there in 1800. They never manufactured weapons. They were merchant princes, not mechanics and arms were only a small part of their business. Around 1801, Ketland Co. began trading overseas and the company ceased operations around 1831.

== See also ==
- Gun Quarter
