= Birmingham Proof House =

Firearms testing establishment in Birmingham, England

The Guardians of the Birmingham Proof House
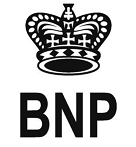
- Type: Government-owned
- Industry: Firearms
- Founded: 1813, by act of Parliament
- Headquarters: 52°28′49.69″N 1°53′4.65″W, Banbury Street, Birmingham, UK
- Services: Proving and certification of firearms and ammunition, quality testing
- Website: www.gunproof.com
- Footnotes; The house itself is now a grade II* listed museum

Gun Barrel Proof Act 1855 (Note: Section 1.)
- Act of Parliament
- Parliament of the United Kingdom
- Long title: An Act for insuring the due Proof of Gun Barrels in England, and for other Purposes.
- Citation: 18 & 19 Vict. c. cxlviii
- Territorial extent: United Kingdom

Dates
- Royal assent: 16 July 1855
- Commencement: 8 August 1855 (Note: Section 2.)
- Repealed: 22 July 1868

Other legislation
- Repealed by: Gun Barrel Proof Act 1868

Status: Repealed

Text of statute as originally enacted

Gun Barrel Proof Act 1868
- Act of Parliament
- Parliament of the United Kingdom
- Long title: An Act for repealing the Gun Barrel Proof Act, 1855, and for making other Provisions in lieu thereof; and for altering the Constitution of the Guardians of the Birmingham Proof House; and for better ensuring the due Proof of Gun Barrels; and for other Purposes.
- Citation: 31 & 32 Vict. c. cxiii
- Territorial extent: England and Wales (Note: Section 144.); Scotland (extended); Northern Ireland (extended)

Dates
- Royal assent: 13 July 1868
- Commencement: 22 July 1868

Other legislation
- Repeals/revokes: Gun Barrel Proof Act 1855
- Amended by: Gun Barrel Proof Act 1950; Defence (Transfer of Functions) Act 1964; Decimal Currency Act 1969; Gun Barrel Proof Act 1978; Statute Law (Repeals) Act 1993; Deregulation (Gun Barrel Proving) Order 1996

Status: Amended

Text of statute as originally enacted

Text of the Gun Barrel Proof Act 1868 as in force today (including any amendments) within the United Kingdom, from legislation.gov.uk.

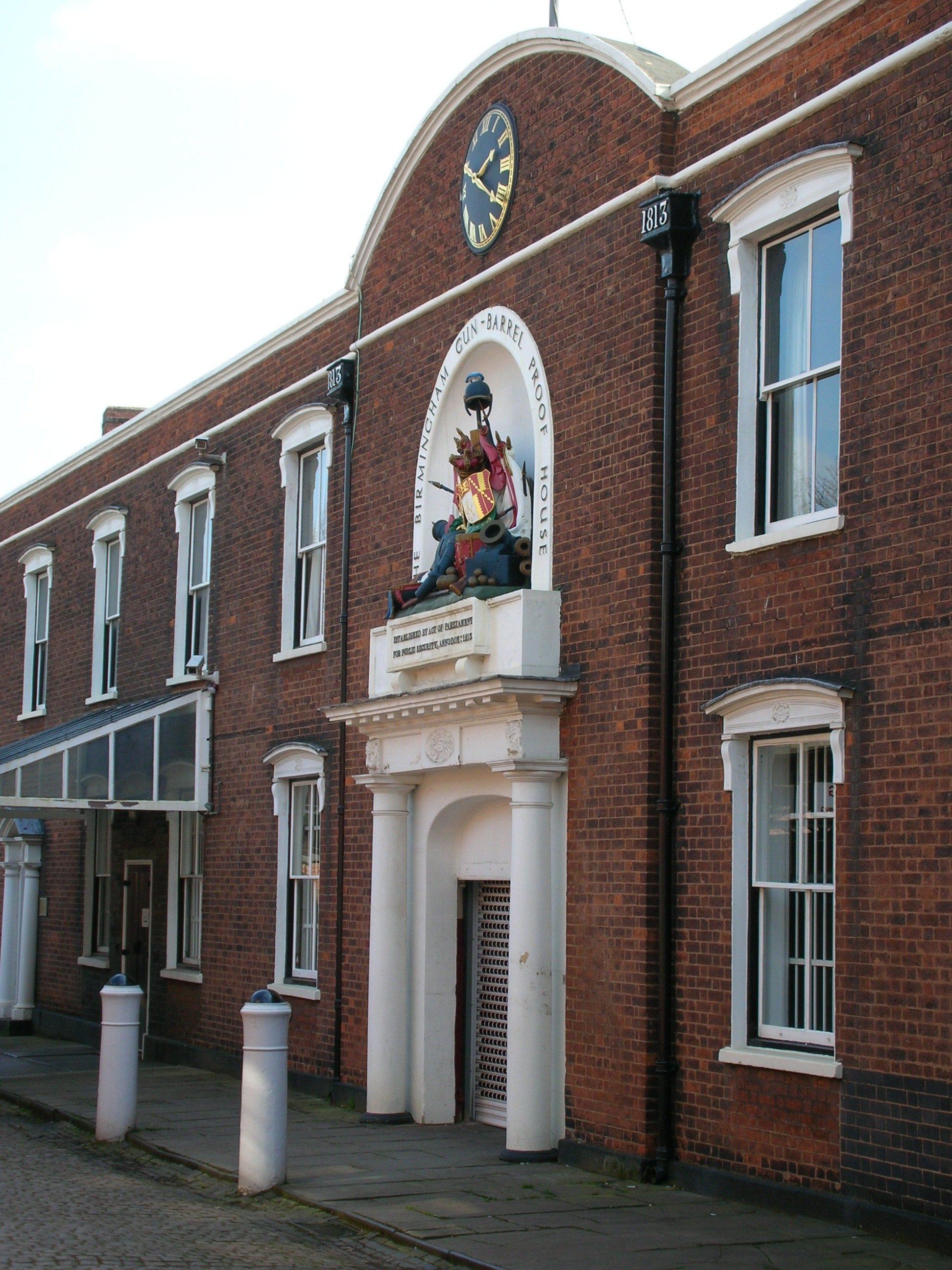
Birmingham Gun Barrel Proof House

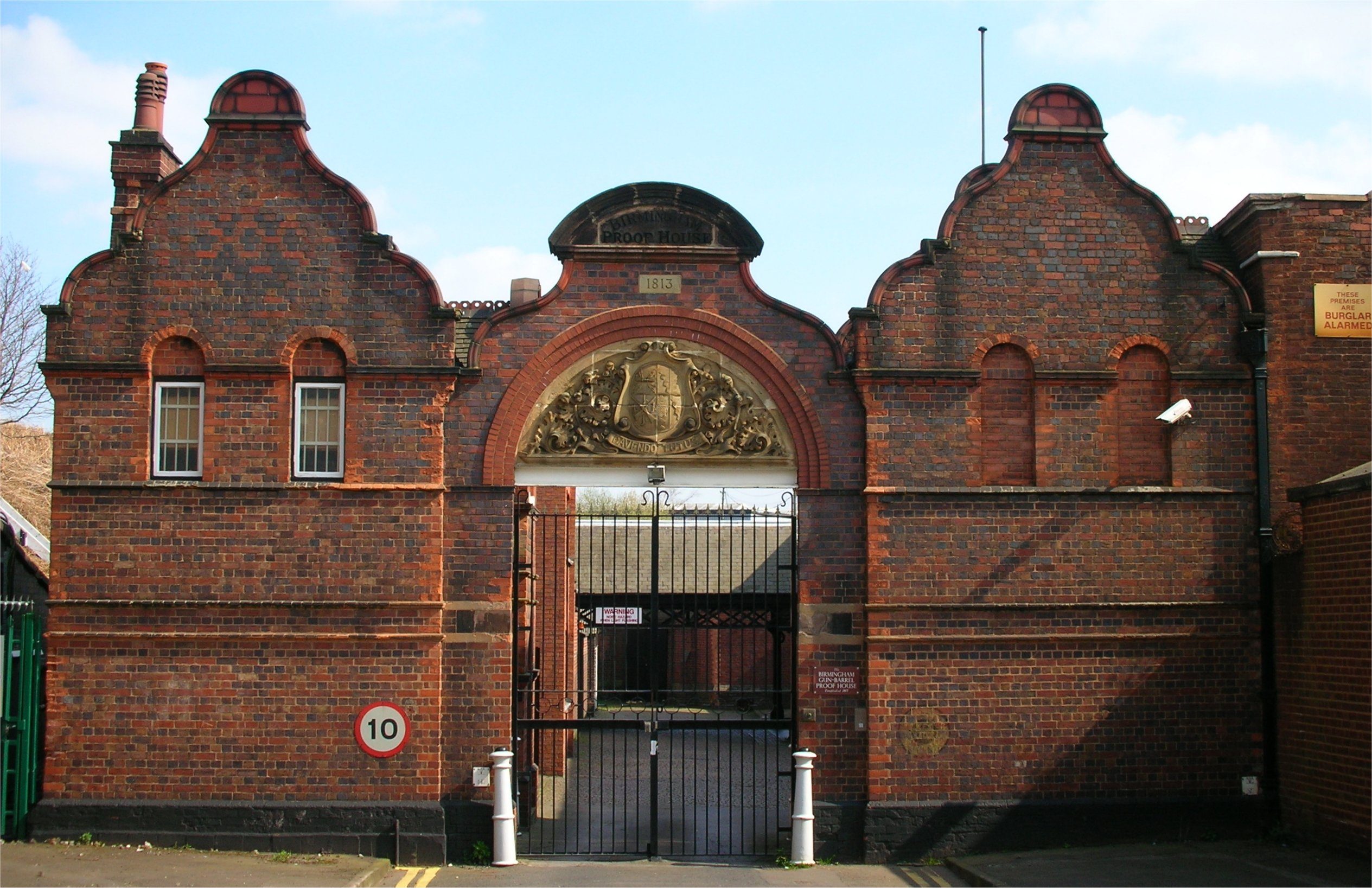
Gates of the Birmingham Gun Barrel Proof House

The Birmingham Gun Barrel Proof House is a weapons proving establishment in Banbury Street, Birmingham, UK. The building was designed by John Horton and consists of a centre bay, emphasised by a segmental parapet, which contains trophies by William Hollins. A Jacobean-style gateway was added in 1883. It is a grade II* listed building.

The Proof House (originally The Guardians, Trustee, and Wardens of the Gun Barrel Proof House of the Town of Birmingham) was established by an act of Parliament, the Firearms Act 1813 (53 Geo. 3. с. 115), at the request and expense of the then prosperous Birmingham gun trade. The corporation was renamed to "The Guardians of the Birmingham Proof House" by the Gun Barrel Proof Act 1855 (18 & 19 Vict. c. cxlviii). Its remit was to provide a testing and certification service for firearms in order to prove their quality of construction, particularly in terms of the resistance of barrels to explosion under firing conditions. Such testing prior to sale or transfer of firearms is made mandatory by the Gun Barrel Proof Act 1868 (31 & 32 Vict. c. cxiii), which made it an offence to sell, offer for sale, transfer, export or pawn an unproofed firearm, with certain exceptions for military organisations.

The proof process is that of testing a firearm for integrity using a severely overcharged cartridge, or proof load which is fired through the gun in an armoured testing chamber. This exposes it to pressures far beyond what it would experience in normal service. It is awarded a stamped proof mark if it survives without either being destroyed or suffering damage from the proof load. Larger guns were tested at a shooting range in Bordesley along a railway viaduct; however, the expansion of the city centre resulted in the closure of the shooting range.

Proof may be rendered invalid if the firearm is damaged or modified significantly; at this point it is described as "out of proof" and must be re-proved before it can be sold or transferred. Note that the correct term for a satisfactorily tested firearm is proved, or proven.

There are penalties for non-compliance with proof laws; a fine of £5,000 may be levied for selling an unproofed or out-of proof firearm, more if a number of firearms are involved in a transaction. Tampering with, or forging, a proof mark is regarded as even more serious.

The Proof House still exists, largely unchanged in both purpose and construction, although it offers a wider range of services including ammunition testing and firearm accident investigation. The building contains a museum of arms and ammunition, and can be visited by prior arrangement.

== See also ==
- Birmingham Gun Quarter
- Worshipful Company of Gunmakers
