= .455 Webley =

British handgun cartridge

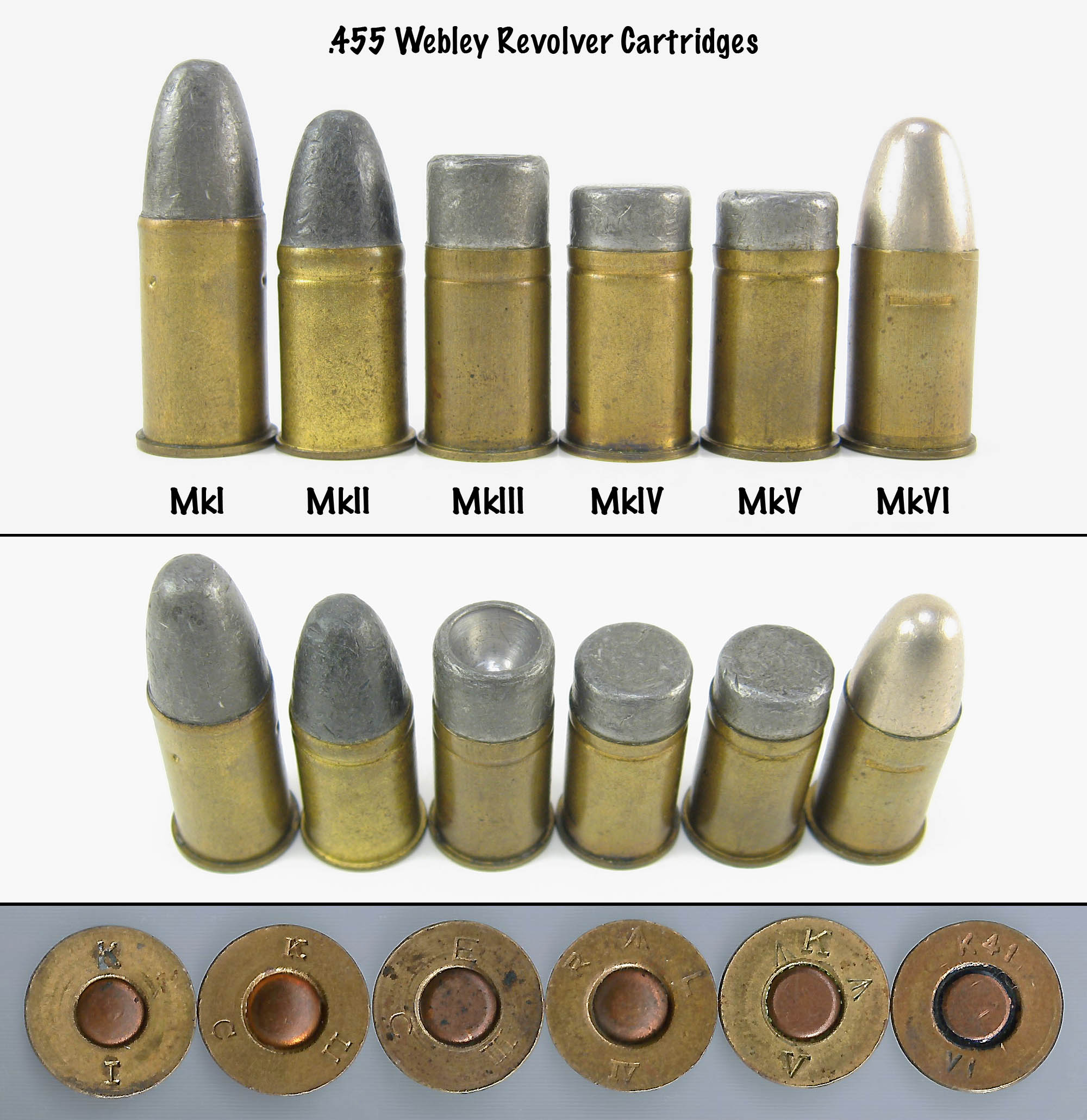
- A variety of .455 Webley cartridges
- Type: Revolver
- Place of origin: United Kingdom

Production history
- Manufacturer: Royal Laboratory Woolwich Arsenal, Birmingham Small Arms Company, Eley Brothers, Kynoch Limited, Grenfell & Accles, Kings Norton Metal Company, Dominion Cartridge Company.
- Variants: Mk I / Mk II

Specifications
- Case type: Straight, rimmed
- Bullet diameter: 0.454 / 0.454 in (11.5 / 11.5 mm)
- Neck diameter: 0.473 / 0.476 in (12.0 / 12.1 mm)
- Shoulder diameter: na / na
- Base diameter: 0.478 / 0.480 in (12.1 / 12.2 mm)
- Rim diameter: 0.530 / 0.535 in (13.5 / 13.6 mm)
- Rim thickness: 0.039 / 0.045 in (0.99 / 1.14 mm)
- Case length: 0.886 / 0.770 in (22.5 / 19.6 mm)
- Overall length: 1.460 / 1.230 in (37.1 / 31.2 mm)
- Case capacity: 23.23 / 18.30 gr H_{2}O (1.505 / 1.186 cm^{3})
- Primer type: Large pistol (Small pistol in modern Fiocchi loadings)
- Maximum pressure: 13,000 psi (90 MPa)

Ballistic performance
| Bullet mass/type | Velocity | Energy |
|---|---|---|
| 265 gr (17 g) FMJ | 700 ft/s (210 m/s) | 289 ft⋅lbf (392 J) |
| 265 gr (17 g) | 600 ft/s (180 m/s) | 212 ft⋅lbf (287 J) |
| 265 gr (17 g) | 757 ft/s (231 m/s) | 337 ft⋅lbf (457 J) |
| 265 gr (17 g) | 600 ft/s (180 m/s) | 220 ft⋅lbf (300 J) |
| 200 gr (13 g) | 900 ft/s (270 m/s) | 360 ft⋅lbf (490 J) |

.455 Webley is a British handgun cartridge, most commonly used in the Webley top break revolvers Marks I through VI. It is also known as ".455 Eley" and ".455 Colt" and "Webley .455 revolver".

The .455 cartridge was a service revolver cartridge, featuring a rimmed cartridge firing a .455 in (11.5 mm) bullet at the relatively low velocity of 650 ft/s (190 m/s). The result was a cartridge and handgun combination with comparatively mild recoil.

The .455 Webley cartridge remained in service with British and Commonwealth forces until the end of the Second World War.

== Variants ==
Six main types of .455 ammunition were produced:

- .455 Webley Mk I [11.55×21.7mmR]: Introduced in 1891. 265 grain (17.2 g) solid lead round-nosed bullet propelled by black powder. All subsequent .455 designs used cordite propellant. In 1894 some Mark I cartridges were loaded with cordite (identified by a case cannelure and "C" headstamp) but it was found combustion was more efficient in a shorter case.
- .455 Webley Mk II [11.55×19.3mmR]: Introduced in 1897. 265 grain (17.2 g) solid lead round-nosed bullet propelled by 6.5 gr (0.42 g) cordite. With the change to cordite propellant, case lengths were reduced. There are minor differences between the Mk I and II bullet shape, though these concern the internal dimensions and so are not immediately apparent.
  - (1900–1912) Replaced the Mk III until it was replaced by the Mk IV. The bullet is made of a 12:1 ratio lead-tin alloy.
  - (1914–1939) Replaced the Mk V until it was replaced by the Mk VI. The bullet is made of a 99% lead and 1% antimony alloy.
- .455 Webley Mk III [11.55×19.3mmR]: Introduced in 1898. The famous "Manstopper" bullet intended for police, civilian and colonial use. Essentially, the Mk III was a 218 grain lead "hollowpoint" design, propelled by cordite. The cylindrical bullet had hemispherical hollows at each end: one to seal the barrel, the other to deform on impact. This bullet was soon prohibited for use by the military because it was not compliant with the Hague Convention of 1899. The Mark III was withdrawn from service in 1900 and the Mark II was reintroduced.
- .455 Webley Mk IV [11.55×19.3mmR]: Introduced in 1912. 220 grain, flat-nosed wadcutter with cordite propellant. Designed with the goal of producing a more effective bullet than the Mark II without violating the terms of the Hague Convention.
- .455 Webley Mk V [11.55×19.3mmR]: Introduced in 1914. Identical to the Mk IV bullet, but cast from a harder lead-alloy containing more antimony with cordite propellant. This cartridge was only in use from April to November 1914. Upon its withdrawal the Mark II cartridge was returned to service. Remaining stocks were designated for target practice and unloaded cases were loaded with Mark II bullets.
- .455 Webley Mk VI [11.55×19.3mmR]: Introduced in 1939. A 265-grain full-metal-jacketed bullet intended for military purposes, designed to comply with the Hague Conventions. This cartridge was used during World War II. The propellant was 5.5–7.5 gr (0.36–0.49 g) cordite or 5.5 gr (0.36 g) nitro-cellulose. Cordite-loaded cartridges bear a "VI" on the headstamp while nitrocellulose-loaded cartridges are indicated with a "VIz".

In addition to the Webley revolvers, the British and Canadian armies also ordered several thousand Smith & Wesson .44 Hand Ejector revolvers, chambered in .455 Webley, in a rush to equip their troops for the Great War. The urgency was such that the earliest of these were converted from revolvers already completed and chambered for .44 Special. Approximately 60,000 Colt New Service revolvers were also purchased, in .455.

Commercial manufacturers Fiocchi, PPU, Steinel, and Hornady currently produce the .455 Webley cartridge (in Mk II).

== .455 Webley Auto ==
The .455 Webley Auto Mk I cartridge was produced from 1913 to about the middle of World War II. This is a semi-rimmed cartridge for the Webley & Scott Self Loading pistols.

The early version of the cartridge (c.1904) had a shorter 21.7 mm (0.85 in) semi-rimmed case with a narrow rim and a pointed bullet. A later improved version of the cartridge (c.1910) was similar except it had a 23.54 mm (0.93 in) long case and a round-nosed bullet. The Mk 1 service round (c.1913) was identical to the 1910 version of the cartridge except it had a thicker rim.

The Mk 1 cartridge's bullet headspaced on the rim. It was loaded with a 224 gr (14.5 g; 0.51 oz) cupro-nickel-jacketed bullet with a muzzle velocity of 700 ft/s (210 m/s).

Various submachine-guns were tested using this cartridge, however none was adopted.

=== First World War ===
The Webley & Scott pistol was sold to the Royal Flying Corps and Royal Navy during World War I. There were also some Colt M1911 pistols chambered in .455 Auto purchased by the Royal Navy. Although not a standard sidearm or a standard service cartridge, a few Colt M1911 "British service models" chambered in .455 Auto were sold commercially to British navy and army officers through outfitters. The service ammunition came packed in seven-round boxes stamped "not for revolvers" to prevent confusion.

== .476 Enfield ==
Despite the difference in caliber names, .476 Enfield was quite similar to the .455 Webley. They both feature .455" bullets, the ".476" designation referring to the diameter of the cartridge case, not the diameter of the bullet. Although the Webley Mk I revolver was adopted in 1887, the .455 Webley cartridge wasn't introduced until 1891. In the interim, the new revolvers were loaded with the previous service pistol cartridge, .476 Enfield. Even after .455 Webley ammunition became available, and the casing was shortened in the changeover from the Mk I to Mk II load, all Webley military revolvers, from Mks I though VI, were produced with .455 Webley Mk I case-length chambers. While the .476 Enfield has a cartridge case longer than Webley Mk II, it's shorter than Webley Mk I, therefore .476 Enfield ammunition can be chambered and fired in any Webley military revolver chambered for .455 Webley, in much that same way that .38 Special may be fired in revolvers chambered for .357 Magnum, and .44 Special may be fired in revolvers chambered for .44 Magnum - though in the case of the .476 Enfield and .455 Webley, they both feature the same low velocities.

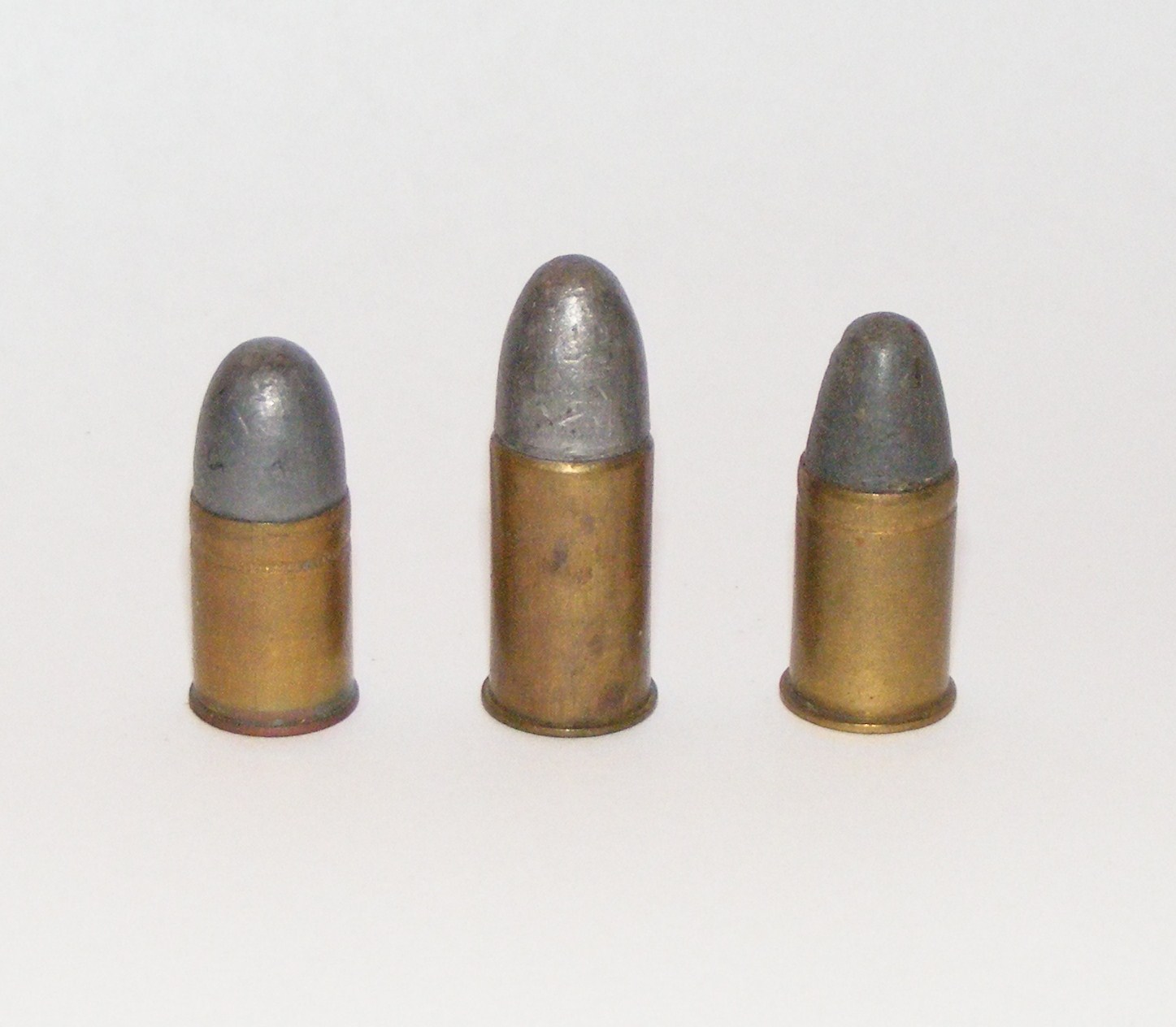
From left to right: .450 Adams, .455 Webley Mk I, .455 Webley Mk II cartridges

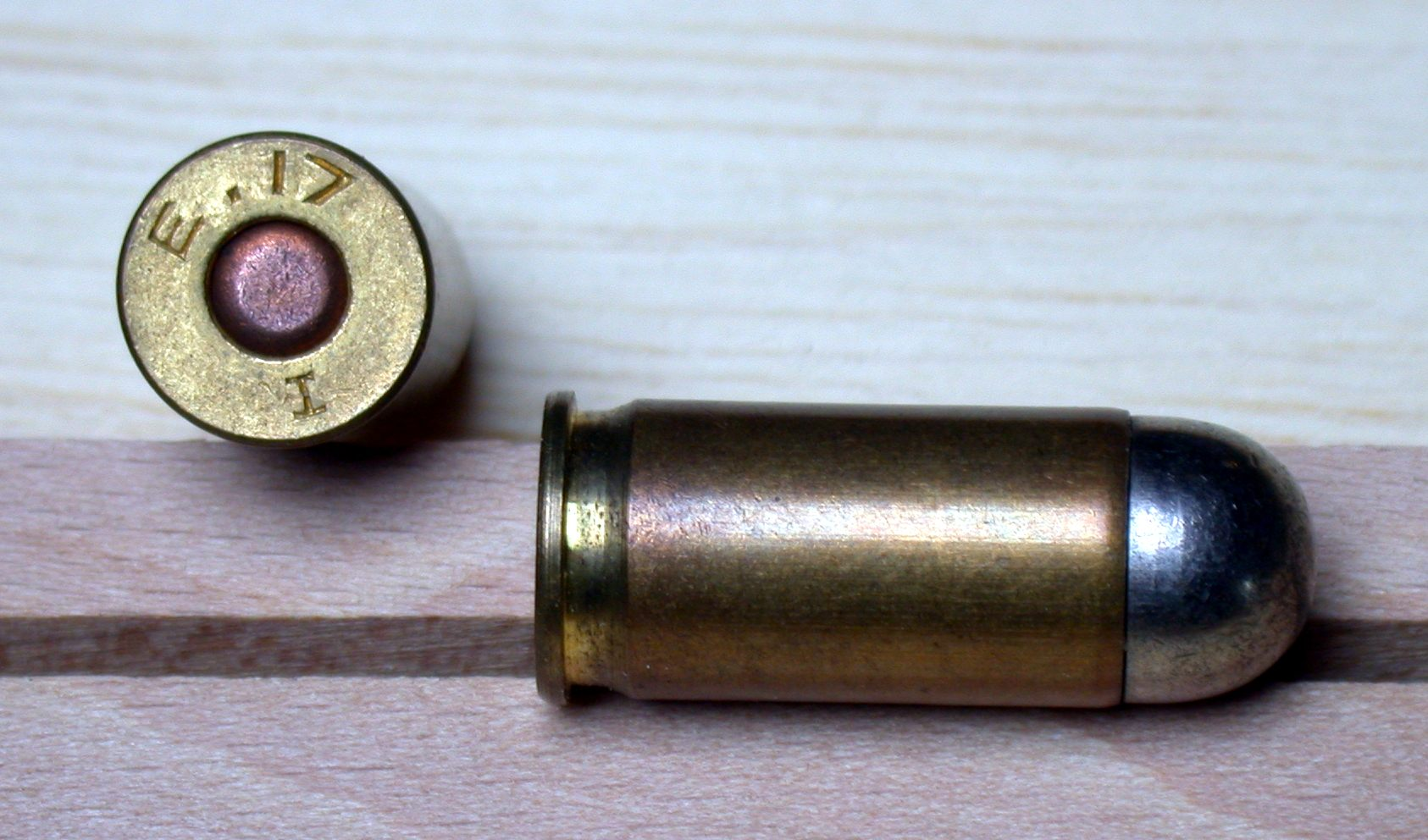
.455 Webley Auto Mk I cartridge

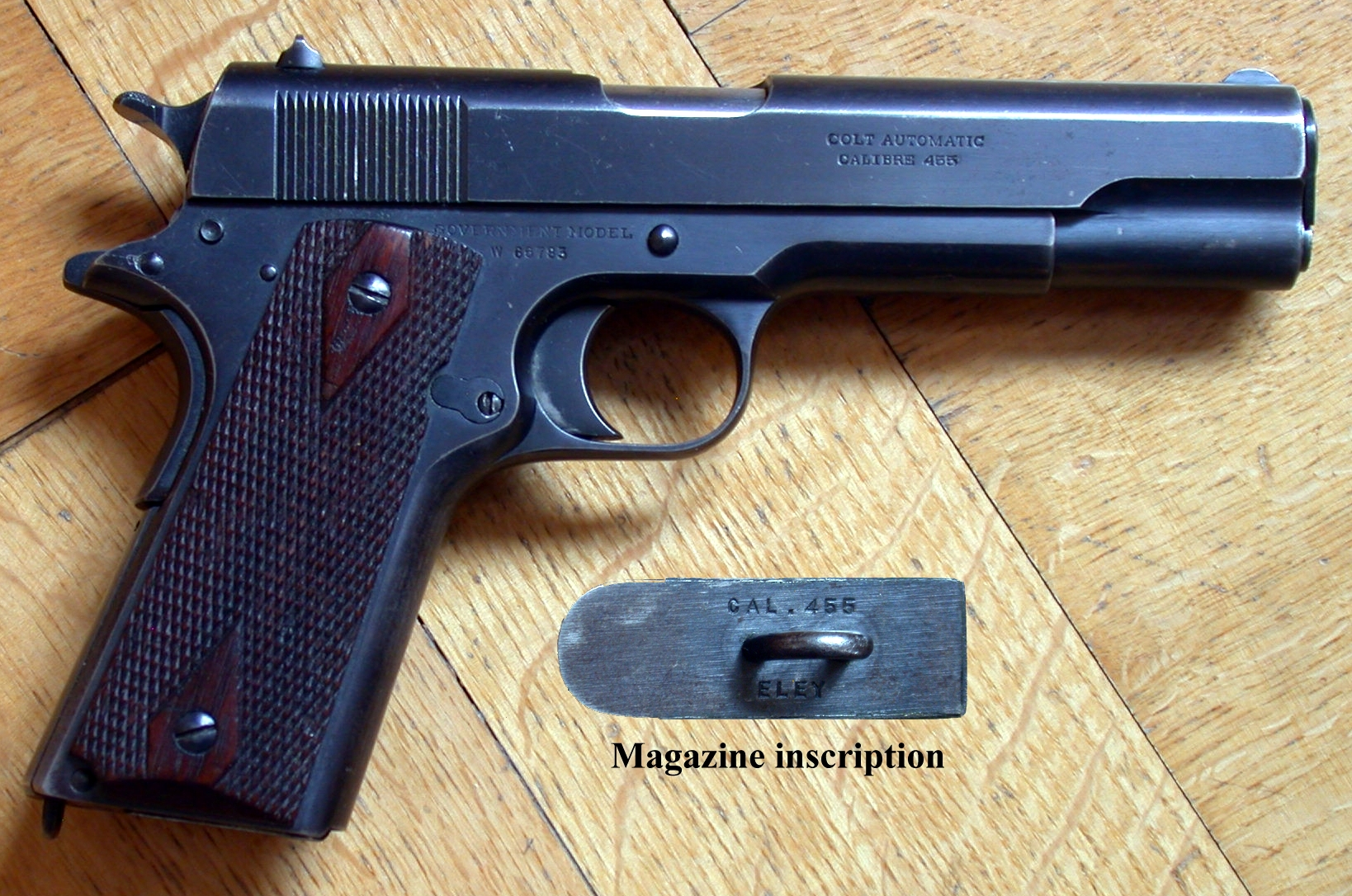
M1911 pistol "British Service Model", which uses the Webley Auto Mk I cartridge. The weapon is stamped with ".455" on the slide and the underside of the magazine

== See also ==
- List of rimmed cartridges
- Table of handgun and rifle cartridges

== Bibliography ==
- Barnes, Frank C., ed. by John T. Amber. ".476 Eley/.476 Enfield Mk-3", in Cartridges of the World, pp. 175 & 178. Northfield, IL: DBI Books, 1972. ISBN 978-0-695-80326-1.
- Maze, Robert J. Howdah to High Power. Tucson, AZ: Excalibur Publications, 2002. ISBN 978-1-880677-17-9.
- Wilson, R. K. Textbook of Automatic Pistols, p. 228. Plantersville, SC: Small Arms Technical Publishing Company, 1943.
