= Gua =

Gua may refer to:

== Transport ==
- GUA, station code for Guadalupe station, in Santa Barbara County, California, United States
- GUA, IATA code for La Aurora International Airport, serving Guatemala City
- GUA, station code for Guaianases on Line 11 (Coral) in São Paulo, Brazil

== Places ==
- Gúa, a parish in Somiedo, Asturias, Spain
- Guà, a commune in Alessandria, Piedmont, Italy
- Gua, Jharkhand, a census town in India
  - Gua massacre, a mass murder of Adivasis in Gua, Jharkhand
- Gua (Tanzanian ward), a ward in Chunya District, Tanzania
- GUA, IOC and UNDP country codes for Guatemala
- MX-GUA, the ISO 3166-2 code for the Mexican state of Guanajuato
- Gua, a subdistrict of Lipis District in Pahang, Malaysia
- Le Gua (disambiguation), the name of two different communes in France

== Biology ==
- GUA, a codon for the amino acid valine
- Gua or Guanine, a nucleobase found in the nucleic acids DNA and RNA

== Languages ==
- Gua language, a Guang language of coastal Ghana
- ISO 639:gua, the Shiki language of northern Nigeria

== Music ==
- Ali Gua Gua, former member of Argentine band Kumbia Queers
- Gua Ah-leh (born 1944), Chinese actress and singer
- Gua, a 2004 album by Emmanuel Jal
- "Guá", a track on the 1975 album Jóia by Caetano Veloso
- "Gua Time", hit song by the 80's boy band Mancha Manchew

== Other uses ==
- Gua (chimpanzee) (1930–1933), a chimpanzee raised as though she were a human child
- GUA, Global Unicast Address
- Gua, an alien race in the Canadian TV series First Wave
- Growing Up Absurd, 1960 book by Paul Goodman
- Gua Ah-leh (born 1944), Chinese actress and singer
- Alan Gua, a mythical figure from The Secret History of the Mongols

== See also ==
- Guas, a surname (including a list of people with the name)
- Gau Island, an island in Fiji
- GWA (disambiguation)
- Le Gua (disambiguation)
- Guha (disambiguation)
