= Colt Single Action Army =

.45 caliber U.S. service revolver

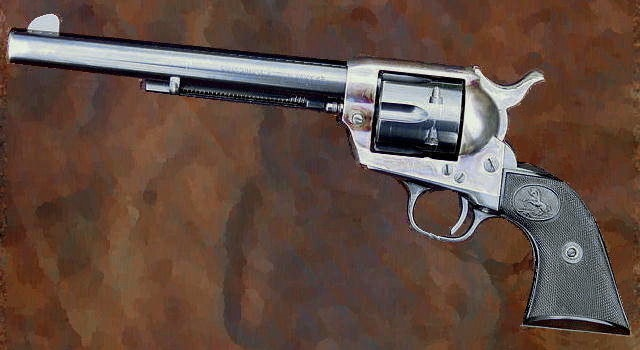
- A model with a 7 1/2 in. barrel
- Type: Service revolver
- Place of origin: United States

Service history
- In service: 1873–1945
- Used by: United States; Canada; Native Americans; Mexico; Ireland; United Kingdom; South Africa; Australia; Emirate of Afghanistan
- Wars: American Indian Wars; Range wars; North-West Rebellion; Spanish–American War; Philippine–American War; First Boer War; Mexican Border War; Mexican Revolution; Second Boer War; Irish War of Independence; World War I; World War II

Production history
- Designer: William Mason and Charles Brinckerhoff Richards
- Designed: 1872
- Manufacturer: Colt's Patent Firearms Manufacturing Company
- Produced: 1873–1941; 1956–1974; 1976–1982; 1994–present
- No. built: 457,000+

Specifications
- Mass: 2.31 lbs (1.048 kg; with 7 1/2 in. barrel)
- Length: 10.25 in. (260 mm, with 4 3/4 in. barrel); 11 in. (279 mm, with 5 1/2 in. barrel); 13 in. (330 mm, with 7 1/2 in. barrel)
- Cartridge: .45 Colt.44-40 WCF.38-40 WCF.32-20 WCF.38 Long Colt.22 Long Rifle.38 Special.45 ACP.357 Magnum.44 Special; Numerous other calibers
- Action: Single-action revolver
- Feed system: 6-round cylinder

The Colt Single Action Army (also known as the SAA, Model P, Peacemaker, M1873, or Frontier) is a single-action revolver. It was designed for the U.S. government service revolver trials of 1872 by Colt's Patent Firearms Manufacturing Company (today known as Colt's Manufacturing Company) and was adopted as the standard-issued revolver of the U.S. Army from 1873 to 1892.

The Colt SAA has been offered in over 30 different calibers and various barrel lengths. Its overall appearance has remained consistent since 1873. Colt has cancelled its production twice, but renewed it due to popular demand. The revolver was dubbed the "Peacemaker", and is a famous piece of Americana and the American Wild West era, due to its popularity with ranchers, lawmen, and outlaws alike. Today, it is mainly bought as memorabilia by collectors and re-enactors. Its design has influenced the production of numerous other models from other companies.

The original length of the barrel, issued to the U.S. Cavalry, was 7 1/2 inches (19 cm), with an overall length of 13 inches (33 cm).

== History ==
Bound by the Rollin White patent (#12,648, April 3, 1855), and not wanting to pay a royalty fee to Smith & Wesson, Colt could not begin development of bored-through revolver cylinders for metallic cartridge use until April 4, 1869. For the design, Colt turned to two of its best engineers: William Mason and Charles Brinckerhoff Richards who had developed a number of revolvers and black powder conversions for the company. Their effort was designed for the United States government service revolver trials of 1872 by Colt's Patent Firearms Manufacturing Company and adopted as the standard military service revolver. Production began in 1873 with the Single Action Army model 1873, also referred to as the "New Model Army Metallic Cartridge Revolving Pistol".

The first production Single Action Army, serial number 1, thought lost for many years after its production, was found in a barn in Nashua, New Hampshire, in the early 1900s. This gun was chambered in .44 S&W, a centerfire design containing charges of up to 40 grains (2.6 g) of fine-grained black powder and a 255-grain (16.5 g) blunt roundnosed bullet. Relative to period cartridges and most later handgun rounds, it was quite powerful in its full loading.

The Colt Single Action Army revolver, along with the 1870 and 1875 Smith & Wesson American and Model 3 "Schofield" revolvers, replaced the Colt 1860 Army Percussion revolver. The Colt quickly gained favor over the S&W and remained the primary U.S. military sidearm until 1892 when it was replaced by the .38 Long Colt caliber Colt Model 1892, a double-action revolver with swing-out cylinder. By the end of 1874, serial no. 16,000 was reached; 12,500 Colt Single Action Army revolvers chambered for the .45 Colt cartridge had entered service and the remaining revolvers were sold in the civilian market.

== First generation (1873–1941) ==
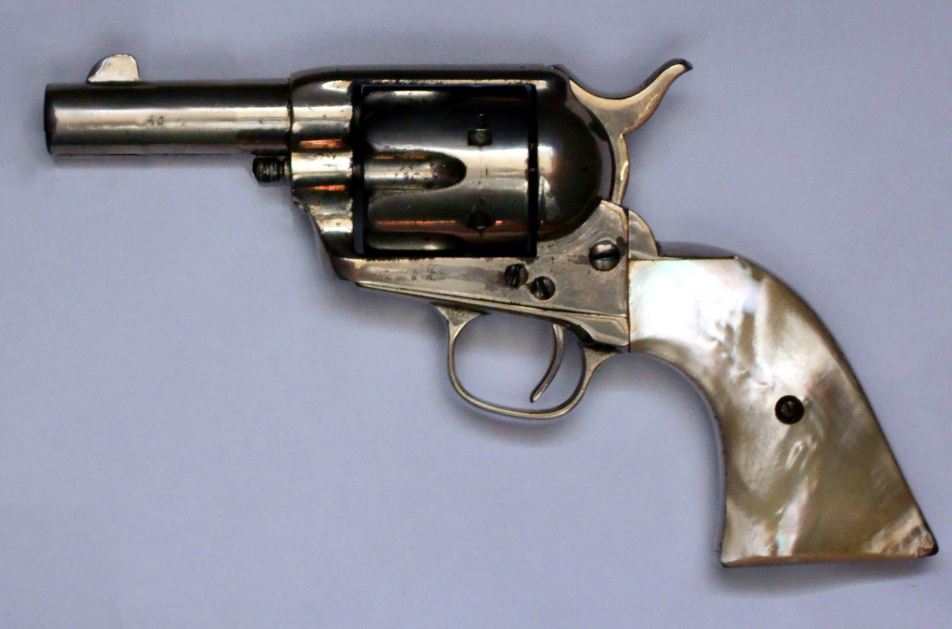
Colt Sheriff's Model, 3-inch (7.6 cm) barrel

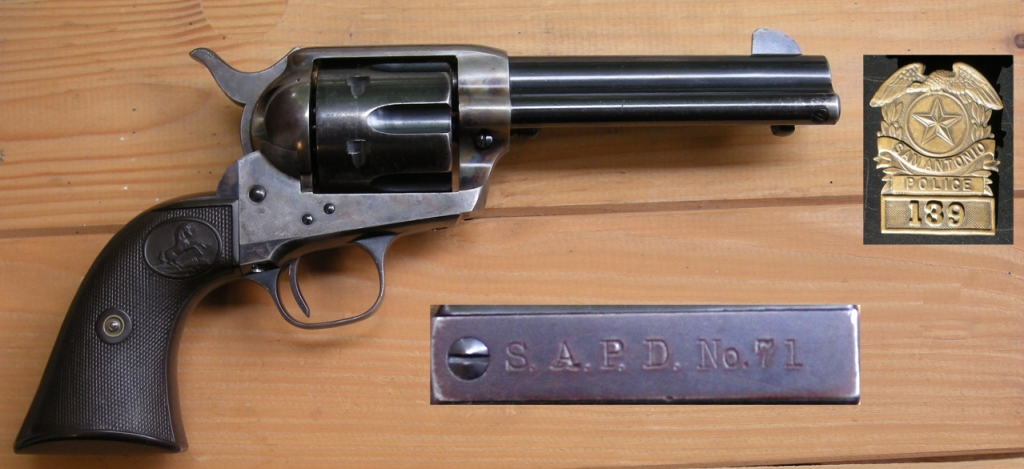
Colt SAA formerly used by the San Antonio Police Department

The Single Action Army became available in standard barrel lengths of 4 3/4 inch, 5 1/2 inch, as well as the Cavalry standard, original 7 1/2 inch. The shorter-barreled revolvers are sometimes called the "Civilian" or "Gunfighter" model (4 3/4 inch) and the Artillery Model (5 1/2 inch). There was also a variant with a sub-4-inch barrel, without an ejector rod, unofficially called the "Sheriff's Model", "Banker's Special", or "Storekeeper".

From 1875 until 1880 Colt marketed a single-action revolver chambered in .44 Henry in a separate number range from no. 1 to 1,863.

A "Flattop Target Model" was listed in Colt's catalogs from 1890 to 1898. Colt manufactured 914 of these revolvers with a frame that was flat on top and fitted with an adjustable leaf rear sight. The front sight consisted of a base with an interchangeable blade.

In 1896, at serial number 164,100, a spring-loaded base pin latch replaced the cylinder pin retaining screw and by 1900, at serial number 192,000, the Colt Single Action was certified for use with smokeless powder. In 1920, larger, highly visible sights replaced the original thin blade and notch. The revolvers remained essentially unchanged from that point until cessation of manufacture at the beginning of World War II.

From 1873 through 1940 (with small numbers assembled during and after World War II, the so-called "Pre-War, Post-War" model), production of the Colt Single Action Army reached 357,859. This is identified as the "Pre War" or "First Generation" of the model. Calibers, at least thirty in all, ranged from .22 rimfire through .476 Eley, with approximately half, or 158,884 (including Bisley and Flat Top Target variations), chambered for .45 Colt. The next most prevalent were the .44-40 Winchester Center fire (WCF) at 71,392; 38-40 (38 WCF) at 50,520; .32-20 Winchester (32 WCF) at 43,284 and, the 41 Colt at 19,676.

=== Military use ===
All original, good condition, U.S. Cavalry and Artillery Single Action Armies (those produced between 1873 and 1891) are considered highly sought after by collectors. Examples bearing OWA (Orville Wood Ainsworth) inspection marks and the comparatively rare Henry Nettleton–inspected Single Action Army Colts have been reported to command prices exceeding $10,000, depending on condition and provenance.

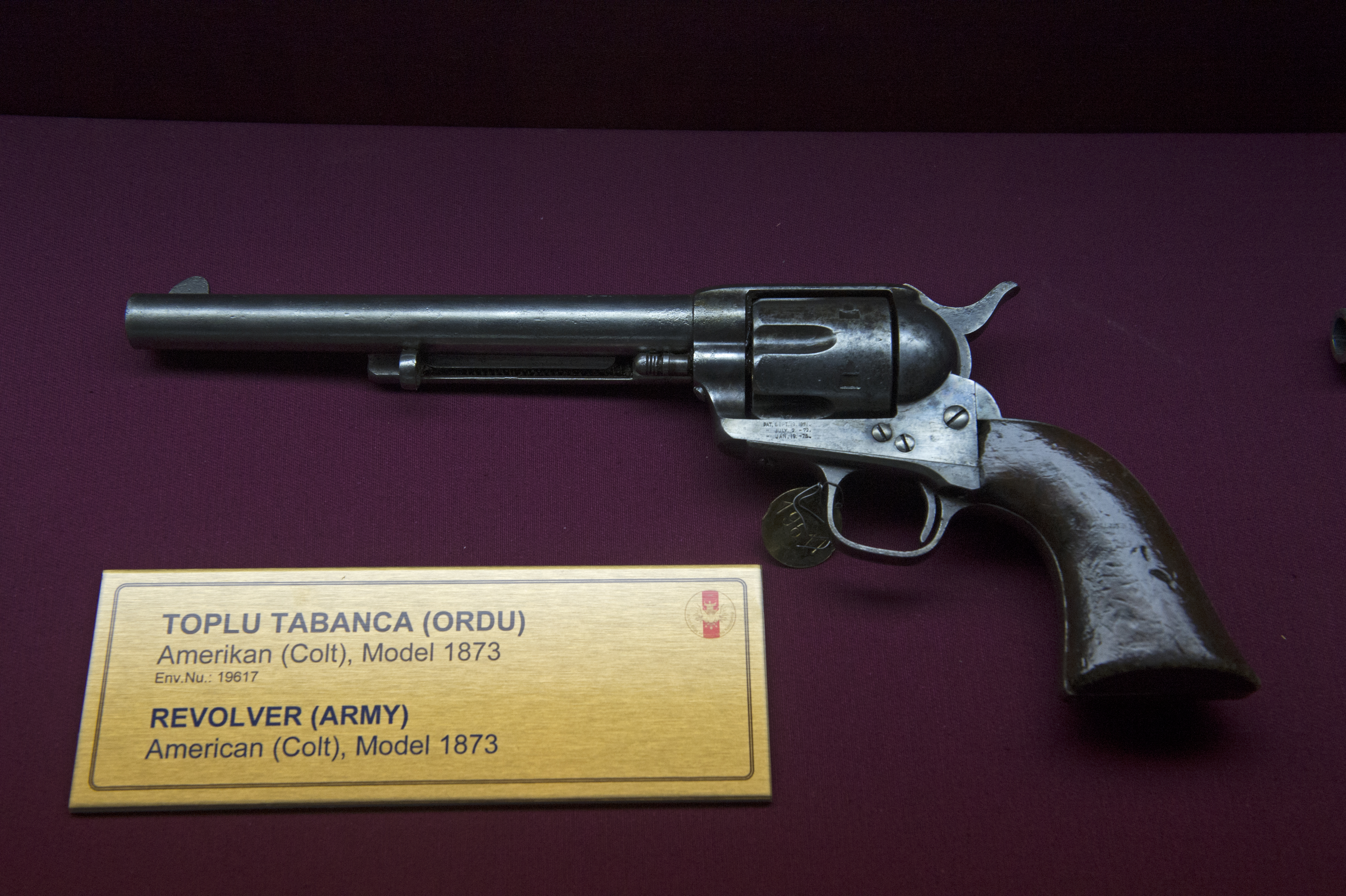
Colt Single Action Army revolver (Model 1873), displayed at the Istanbul Military Museum, Istanbul, Turkey

The OWA Colt refers to the earliest issued Single Action Army guns, which were inspected by Orville W. Ainsworth. Ainsworth was the ordnance sub-inspector at the Colt factory for the first 13 months (October 1873 to November 1874) of the Single Action Army's production. It was Ainsworth who inspected the Colts used by Col. G. A. Custer's 7th Cavalry at the Battle of the Little Bighorn. The number range of possible Little Bighorn Colts is 4500–7527.

Henry Nettleton was the U.S. Principal Sub-inspector in 1878 at the Springfield Armory. Second only to the OWA Colts, Nettleton Colts are prized by serious collectors. Both the Nettleton and OWA Colts have the cartouche (OWA or HN) on the left side of the wood grip.

By the mid-1870s, the Army had purchased a significant number of Smith & Wesson Schofield revolvers chambering a shorter .45 round. Logistical problems arose because the ammunition was not interchangeable. The Colt revolvers would accept the shorter round, but not vice versa. For a time, the Government stopped orders for the longer Colt cartridge and used the Smith & Wesson round exclusively. The Schofield was soon retired and sold to the civilian market.

The largest group of U.S. Colt Cavalry revolvers was inspected by David F. Clark, his D.F.C. cartouche being encountered on revolvers inspected from 1880 to 1887. During 1893, the .45 U.S. Colt Single Action Army revolver was retired by the Cavalry and replaced by the .38 caliber Colt Model 1892 Double Action Army revolver. The .45 Single Action Army revolver was still standard issue to the Infantry, Artillery and other branches of the U.S. Army.

In 1895–1896, the U.S. federal government returned 2,000 SAA revolvers to Colt to be refurbished; 800 were issued to the New York Militia with the 7 1/2 inches (19 cm) barrel and 1,200 were altered to a barrel length of 5 1/2 inches (14 cm). In 1898, 14,900 of the SAA revolvers were altered the same way by Springfield Armory. The original records of the War Department do refer to these revolvers with the shortened barrel as the "Altered Revolver". The name "Artillery" is actually a misnomer, which Sapp speculates may have originated because the Light Artillery happened to have the first units armed with the altered revolver.

The Artillery Single Actions were issued to the Infantry, the Light Artillery, the Volunteer Cavalry and other troops because the standard-issue .38 caliber Colt M 1892 double-action revolver was lacking in stopping power. For that reason, the .45 Artillery SAA Revolvers were used successfully by front troops in the Spanish–American War and the Philippine–American War. Theodore Roosevelt's Rough Riders charged up San Juan Hill wielding the .45 caliber Artillery Model.

The Artillery Model usually had mixed numbers. It can be identified by the U.S. on the frame, the inspector's stamps on different parts (such as a tiny A for Orville W. Ainsworth, DFC, HN, RAC for later inspectors and K for replacement parts) and the cartouche of Rinaldo A. Carr (RAC), the inspector who inspected the refurbished guns, on the grip.

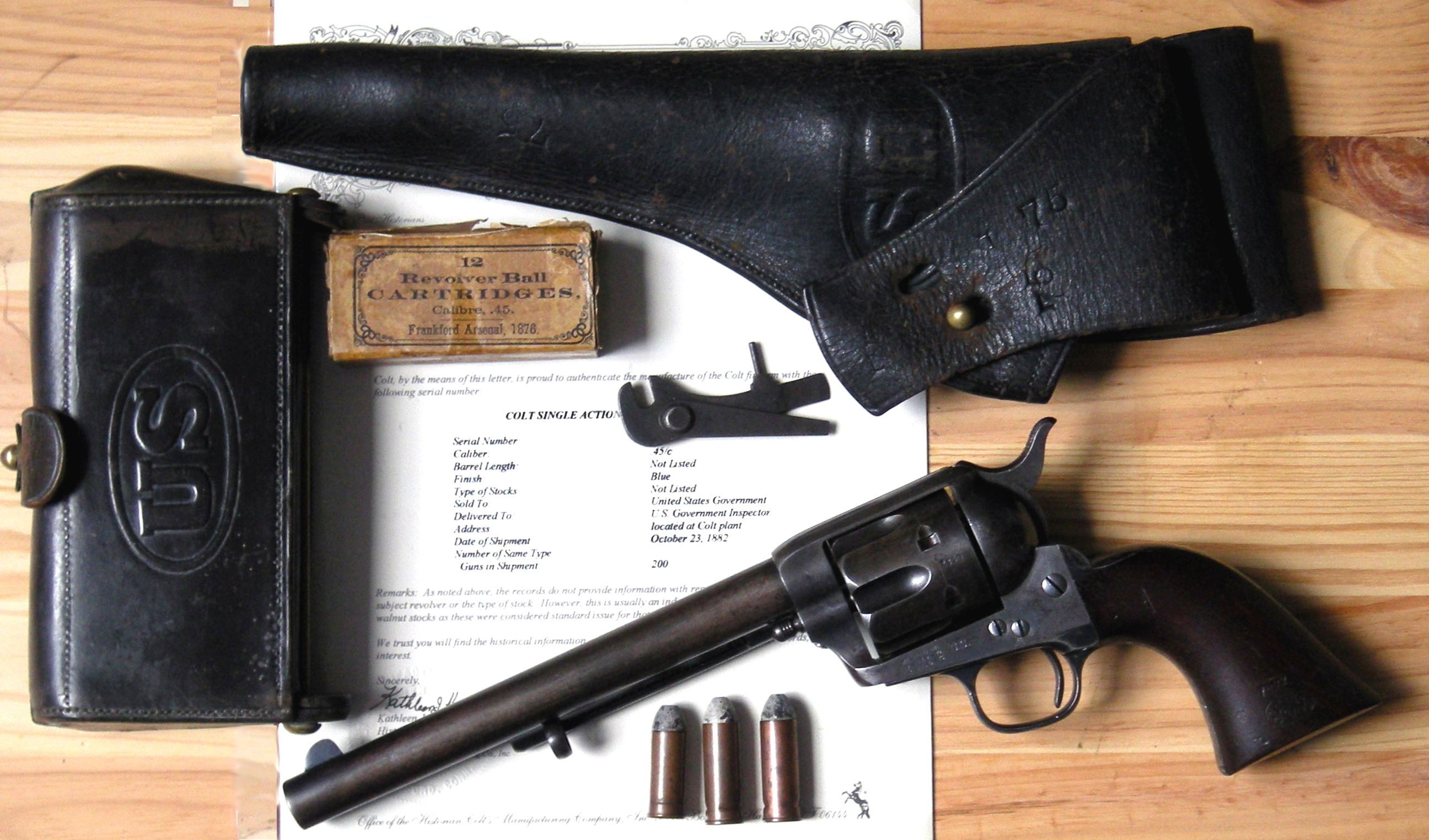
US Colt Single Action 1873 Cavalry Model

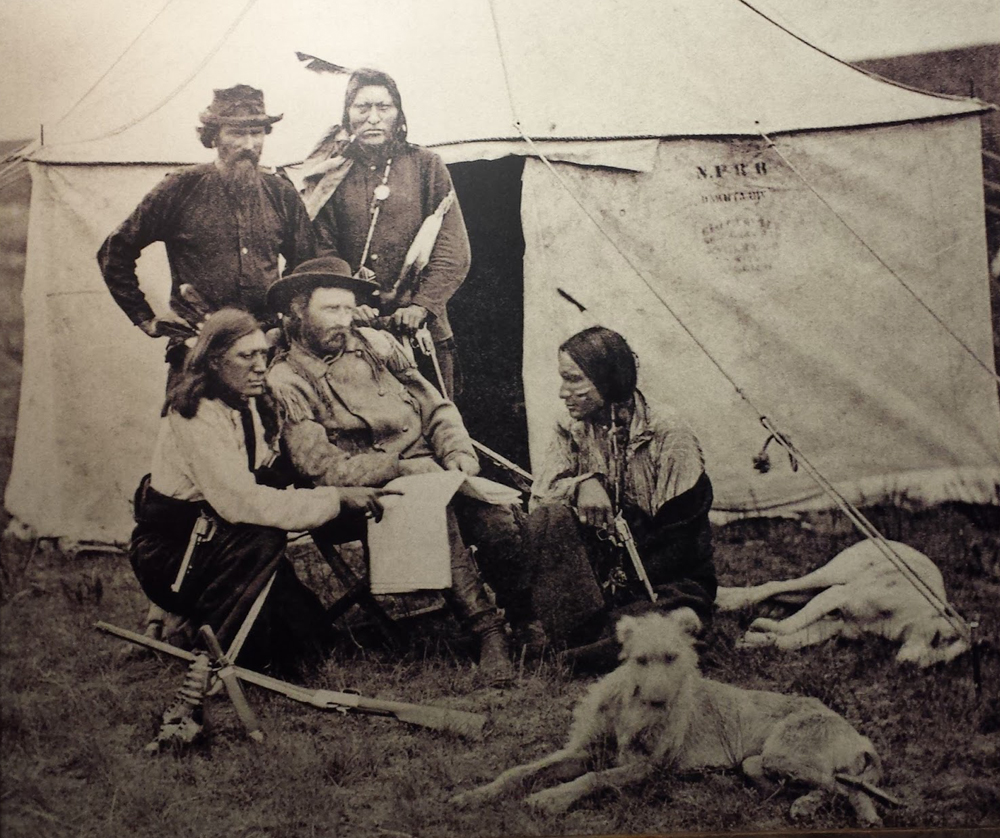
George Armstrong Custer with Arikara Scouts during Black Hills Expedition of 1874; Colt pistols are visible

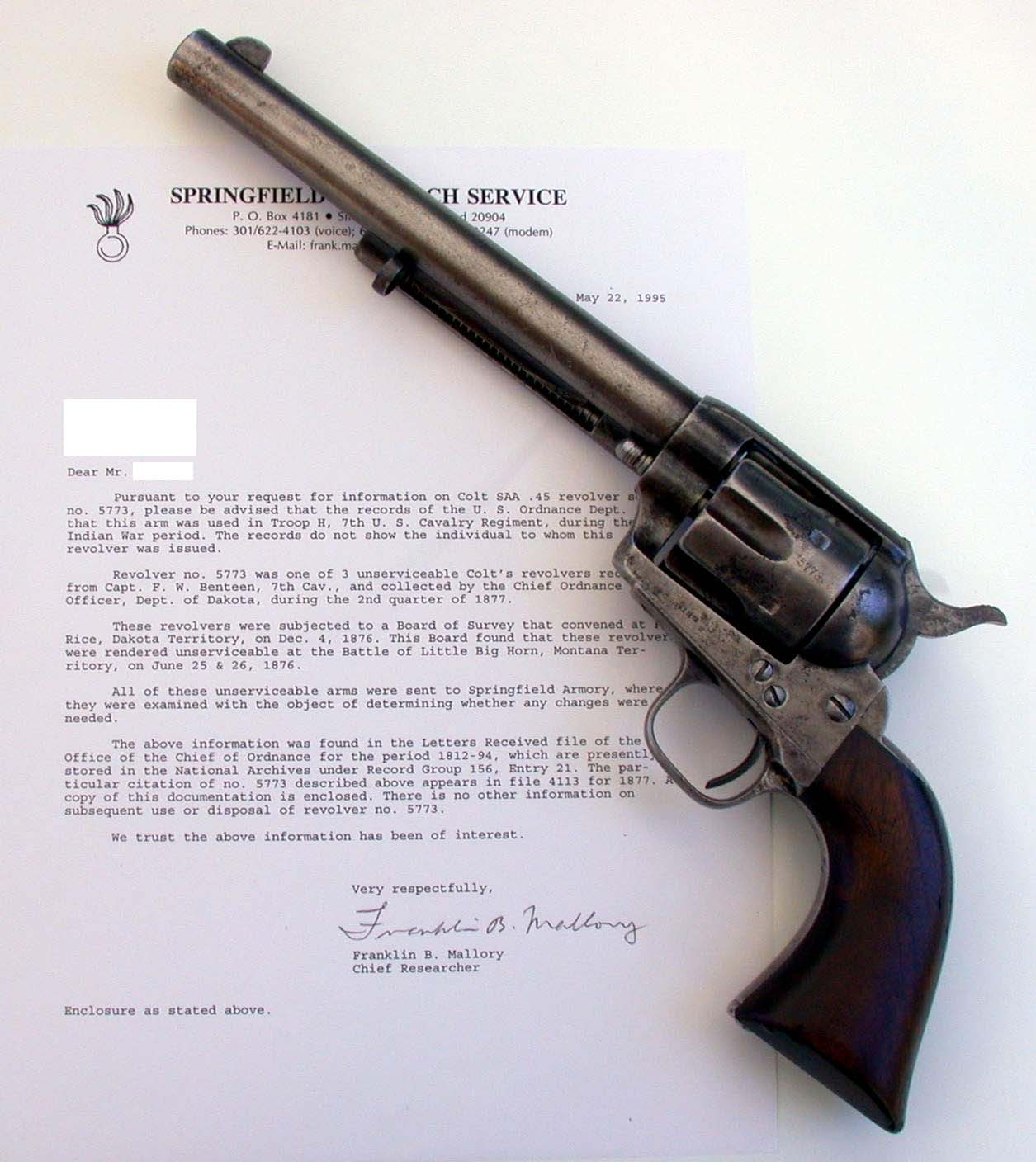
.45 Colt Single Action Army, serial No 5773 7th Cavalry issued 1877

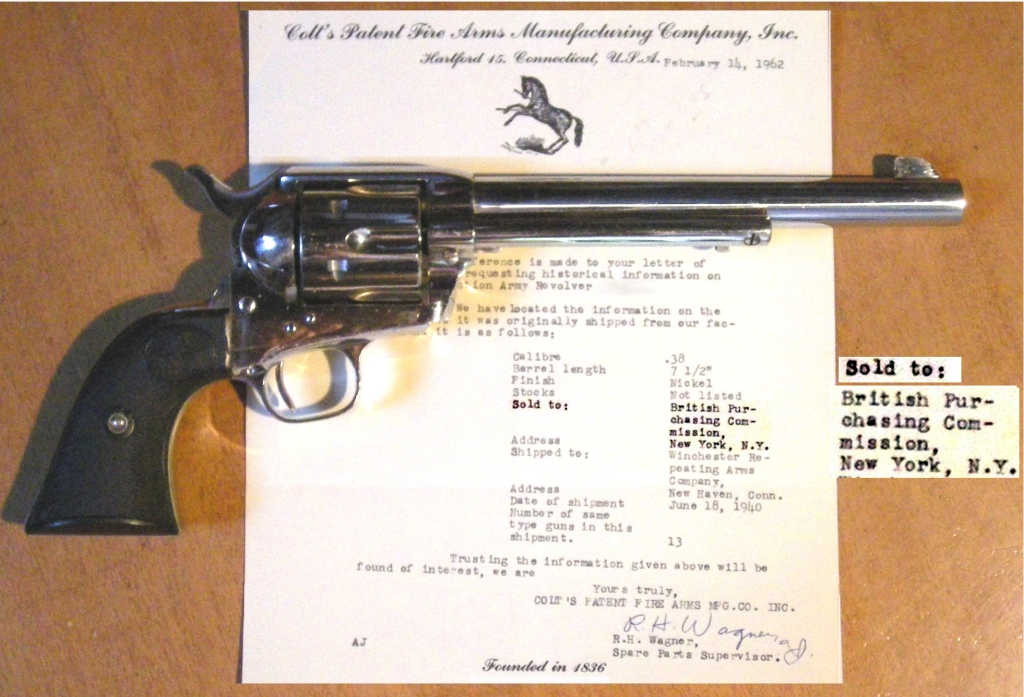
.38 Colt Single Action Battle of Britain 1940

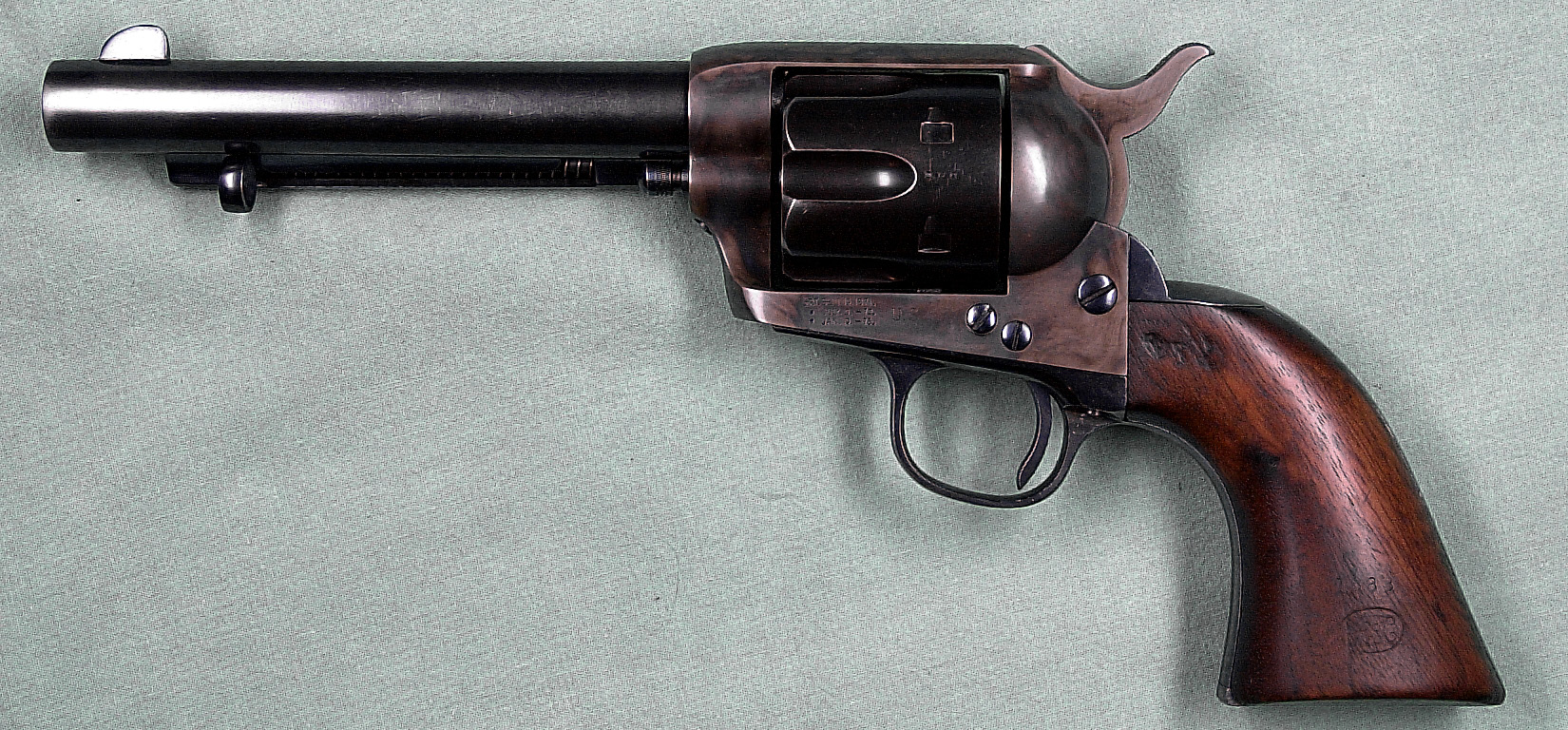
Colt Model 1873, U.S. Artillery Model

=== The Colt Frontier Six-Shooter ===
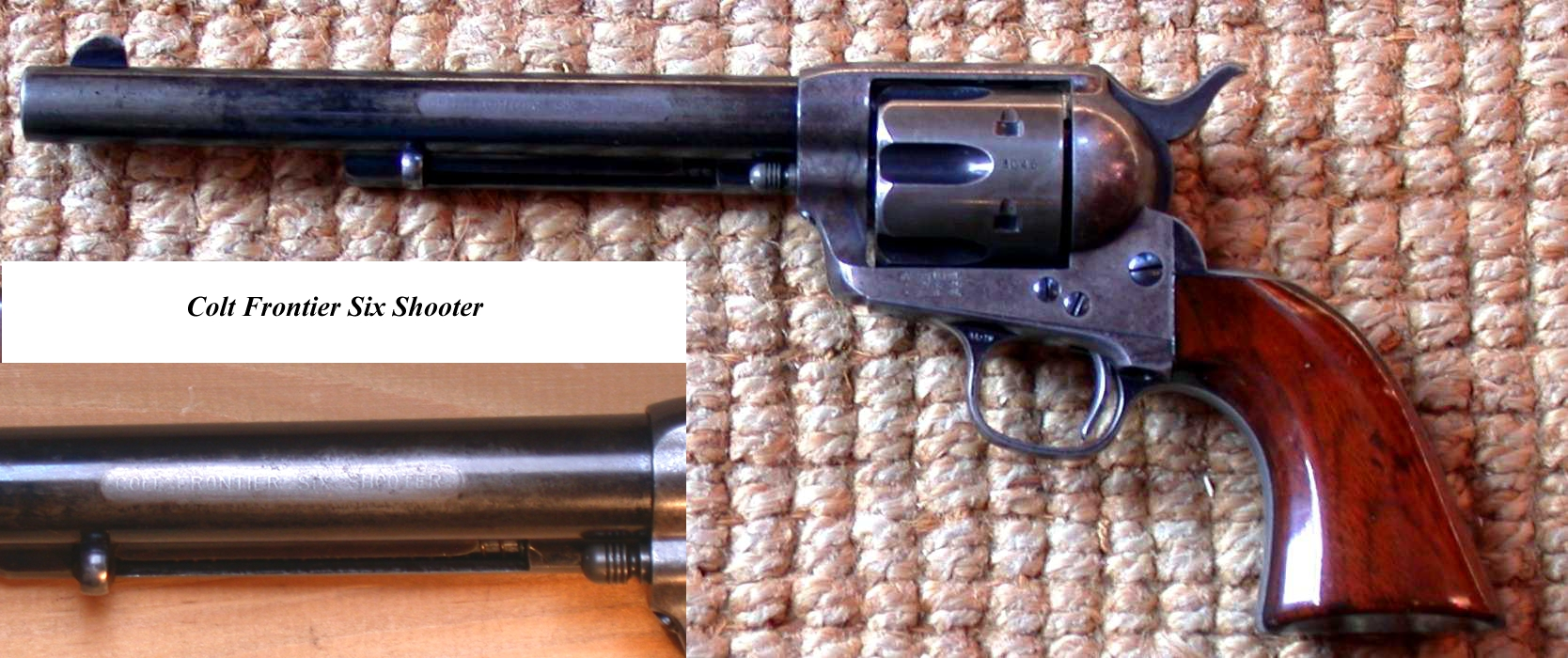
Colt "Frontier Six Shooter", shipped 1884, etched panel

The Colt Frontier or Frontier Six-Shooter was a Colt 1873 "Model P" manufactured in .44-40 Winchester caliber instead of .45 Colt (in which configuration it was called the Single Action Army) so that it was compatible with the new, hugely successful Winchester Model 1873 repeating rifle. Users of both weapons in the Far West appreciated the convenience of being able to carry a single caliber of firearm ammunition. Production of the Model P began in 1877. Colt Frontier Six-Shooter was the actual name of the Colt pistol model, which was acid-etched on the left side of the barrel. After 1889, the legend was roll-stamped, with the designation ".44-40" added in 1919. Later Colt M1878 Double Action Army Models also received this designation on the barrel when chambered in .44 WCF/.44-40 Winchester. The Bisley 1895 Model was the final Colt to wear the Frontier Six Shooter designation.

The combination of a Colt Frontier Six Shooter revolver and the Winchester Model 1873 chambered in .44-40 WCF was one of the most common seen in "the Old West", carried, for example, by the two mounted "Cowboys" at the Gunfight at the O.K. Corral. Notably, Winchester never undercut itself by offering the M1873 chambered for .45 Colt. After the "frontier" days of the West had passed, the Winchester Model 1892 arrived, which joined the Model 1873 in also being offered in alternative .38-40 and .32-20 (.32 WCF) calibers, allowing the same convenience of carrying a single round for both revolver and rifle.

=== The Colt Bisley ===
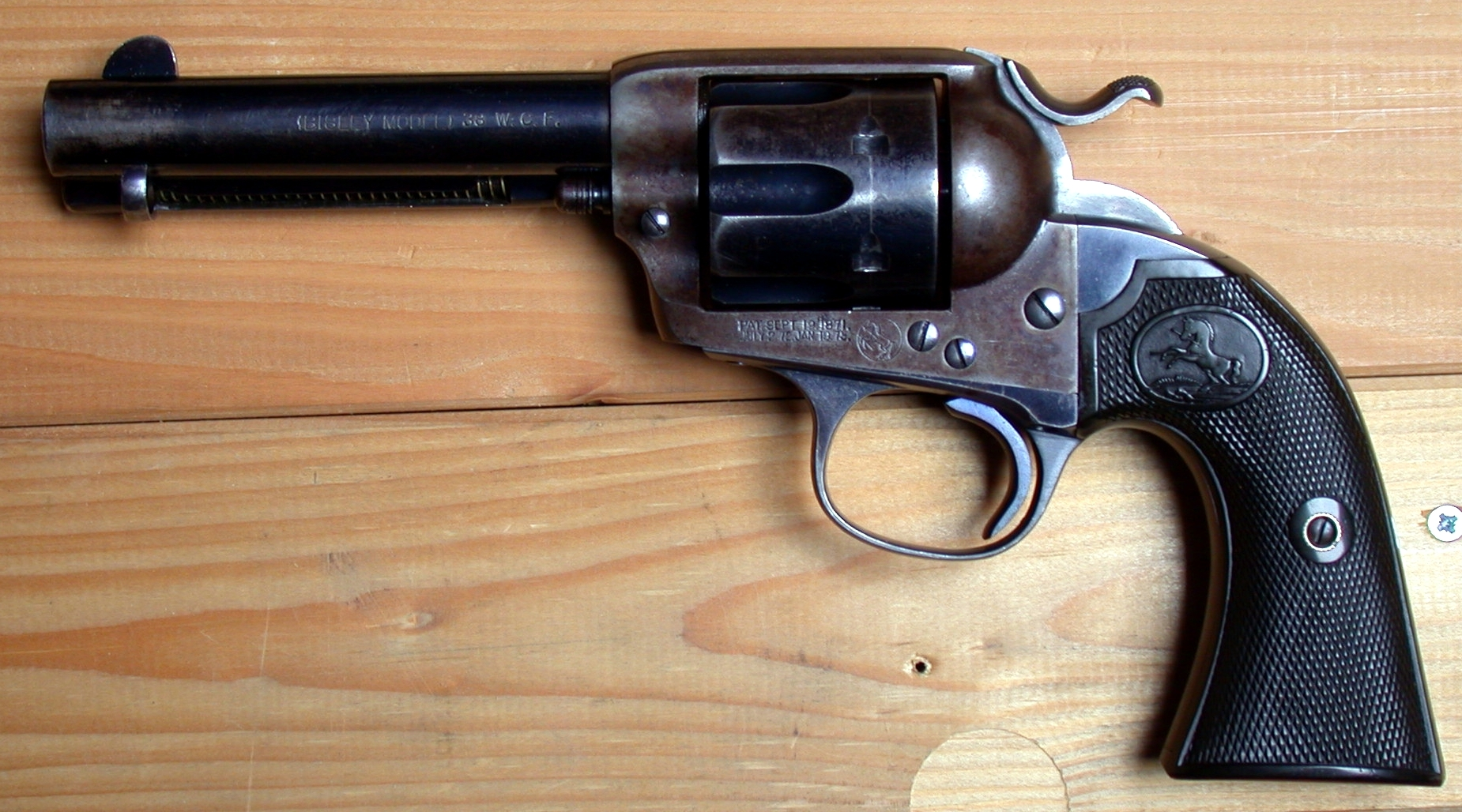
Colt Bisley Model .38-40 WCF, shipped 1904 to Copper Queen Cons. Mining Co in Bisbee, Arizona

The Colt Bisley (1894–1912) was introduced in 1894 as an accurate target pistol. The name Bisley came from the famous firing range in Bisley, England. The Colt Bisley can be distinguished by the longer grip, the wider hammer spur, and the wider trigger. The distinguishing feature of the Bisley Target Model is the topstrap, which is flat and fitted with a sliding rear sight, adjustable for windage only. The front sight is a removable blade, which fits into the slotted base attached to the barrel. The revolvers were supplied with different blades for elevation.

The Bisley mainspring is longer than the SAA mainspring, and the two are not interchangeable; it is attached to the hammer with a stirrup via a forked upper end. The serial numbers are stamped on the frame, the backstrap and the trigger guard at the end of production, with tiny dies.

Bisleys were serial-numbered in the range of 156300–331916, in the same sequence as the Single Action Army. All Bisleys after No. 161,376 had "BISLEY MODEL" with the caliber stamped on the left side of the barrel, which is rare for older Colt revolvers. The most common were in the American calibers of .32-20, .38-40, .45 Colt, .44-40, .41 Long Colt, and also in the British calibers of .450 Eley and .455 Eley. A total number of 44,350 were manufactured. Production of the Bisley was terminated in 1912, but serial No. 331916 was shipped after the First World War. Most Bisley Standard Model Revolvers shipped to a United States address were not used for target shooting, but for self-defense, because the grip and hammer were ideal for fast shooting.

Surveys of existing Bisley show that a much larger number of 4 3/4 in (12 cm) Bisleys, perhaps as high as 62%, have survived as compared to the 5 1/2" and 7 1/2" barreled guns. Considering the majority of Bisleys were made in .32/20 and .38/40, some 60%, it appears that the market for SAAs was changing. In the late 1890s, with increasing urbanization in the Western United States, suggests the possibility that many of these pistols were used as companion pieces to lever-action rifles of the same period. The unique features of the Bisley with their low-slung hammer, less humped backstrap, and shorter barrel may have suited the city-dwelling suit-coat-wearing clientele who still found themselves outdoors, not only on horses but in buggies and automobiles. The need for man-stopping bullets was decreasing in urbanized environments, although in semi-urban areas, a pistol like the Bisley would be suitable for discouraging both four-legged and two-legged "varmints" while also suitable for collecting supper along the road. The Bisley may mark a movement to a more civilized West.

=== The Buntline Special ===
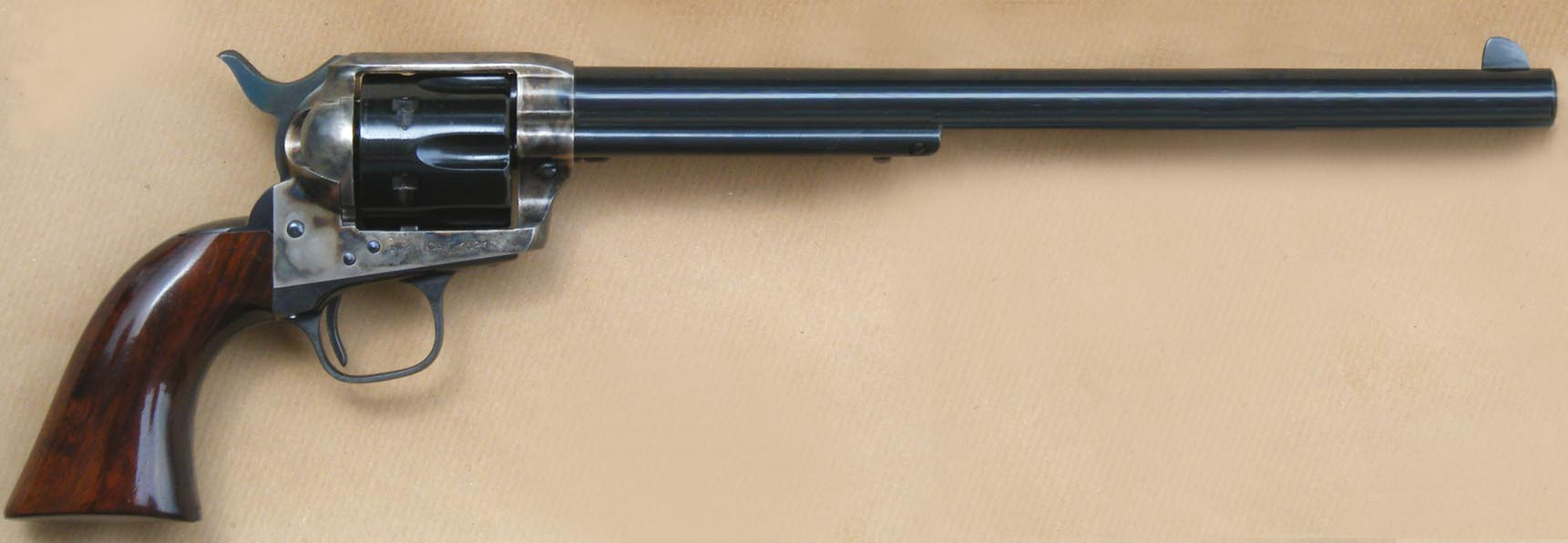
Colt Buntline

Wyatt Earp biographer Stuart N. Lake popularized the myth of the Buntline Special. In his highly fictionalized biography, Wyatt Earp: Frontier Marshal, published in 1931, he wrote that Earp and four other lawmen—Bat Masterson, Bill Tilghman, Charlie Bassett and Neal Brown—were each presented with a customized revolver with a 12-inch-long (30 cm) barrel. However, according to some other accounts, on October 26, 1881, the day of the Gunfight at the O.K. Corral, Earp carried an 1869 .44 caliber Smith & Wesson American Model with an 8-inch (20 cm) barrel.

== Second generation (1956–1974) ==
Second generation Colt engraved in 19th Century pattern

At the beginning of World War II, Colt ceased production of the Single Action Army revolver to devote more time to filling orders for the war. When the war ended, no plans were made to revive the Single Action Army revolver as the design was seen as obsolete. However, the advent of television and Western-themed movies created customer demand for the revolver, so Colt resumed manufacture in 1956 with the Second-Generation line of Single Action Army revolvers.

These Second-Generation Colt Single Action Army revolvers were produced from 1956 to 1974 and carried serial numbers in the range of 0001SA to 73,205SA. Due to the popularity of the television show The Life and Legend of Wyatt Earp, Colt introduced the aforementioned Buntline Special as a Second generation offering from 1957 to 1974.

From 1961 to 1975, Colt offered an adjustable-sight model known as "The New Frontier", capitalizing on President John F. Kennedy's campaign slogan. Colt manufactured 4200 of these revolvers, including 70 built on the Buntline frame.

== Third generation (1976–1993) ==
The third generation began in 1976, characterized by a change in barrel thread pitch and a solid cylinder bushing replacing the removable/replaceable part from the first and second generations. This series ran until 1993 as a limited-issue product with the serial number range of SA80,000 to SA99,999.

== Late third/fourth generation (1994–present) ==
In 1994, production of the SAA resumed with the increase in popularity of "Cowboy Action Shooting" matches. These models are known either as "Late Third Generation" or sometimes Fourth Generation. They have the original style removable/replaceable cylinder bushing. The serial number for this series started at S02001A and continue to use the "S" prefix and "A" suffix as of 2022. Colt currently offers the Single Action Army in one of two finishes: either an all-nickel, or blued with color case-hardened frame; in the traditional three barrel lengths: 4 3/4, 5 1/2, and 7 1/2 inches (12, 14, and 19 cm); and eight chamberings: .32-20, .38-40, .44-40, .38 Special, .357 Magnum, .44 Special, .45 Colt, or .45 ACP; a total of 42 variations.

Colt manufactured third-generation Buntlines and New Frontiers through the Colt Custom Shop, as well as many engraved pistols. In 2010, Colt released a "revival" of the Frontier Six Shooter with a nickel finish.

== The Colt Cowboy ==
Starting in 1999, Colt began manufacturing a version of the Single Action Army revolver with a modern transfer bar safety, allowing it to be carried with the hammer resting on a loaded chamber. The Colt Cowboy, as it was named, was designed to be more affordable than the Single Action Army. It was offered with barrel lengths of 4.75", 5.5", and 7.5". The 7.5" variant was discontinued in 1999, as was the 4.75" variant, which was reintroduced in 2002. Manufacturing of the Colt Cowboy was discontinued in 2003.

== Engraving ==
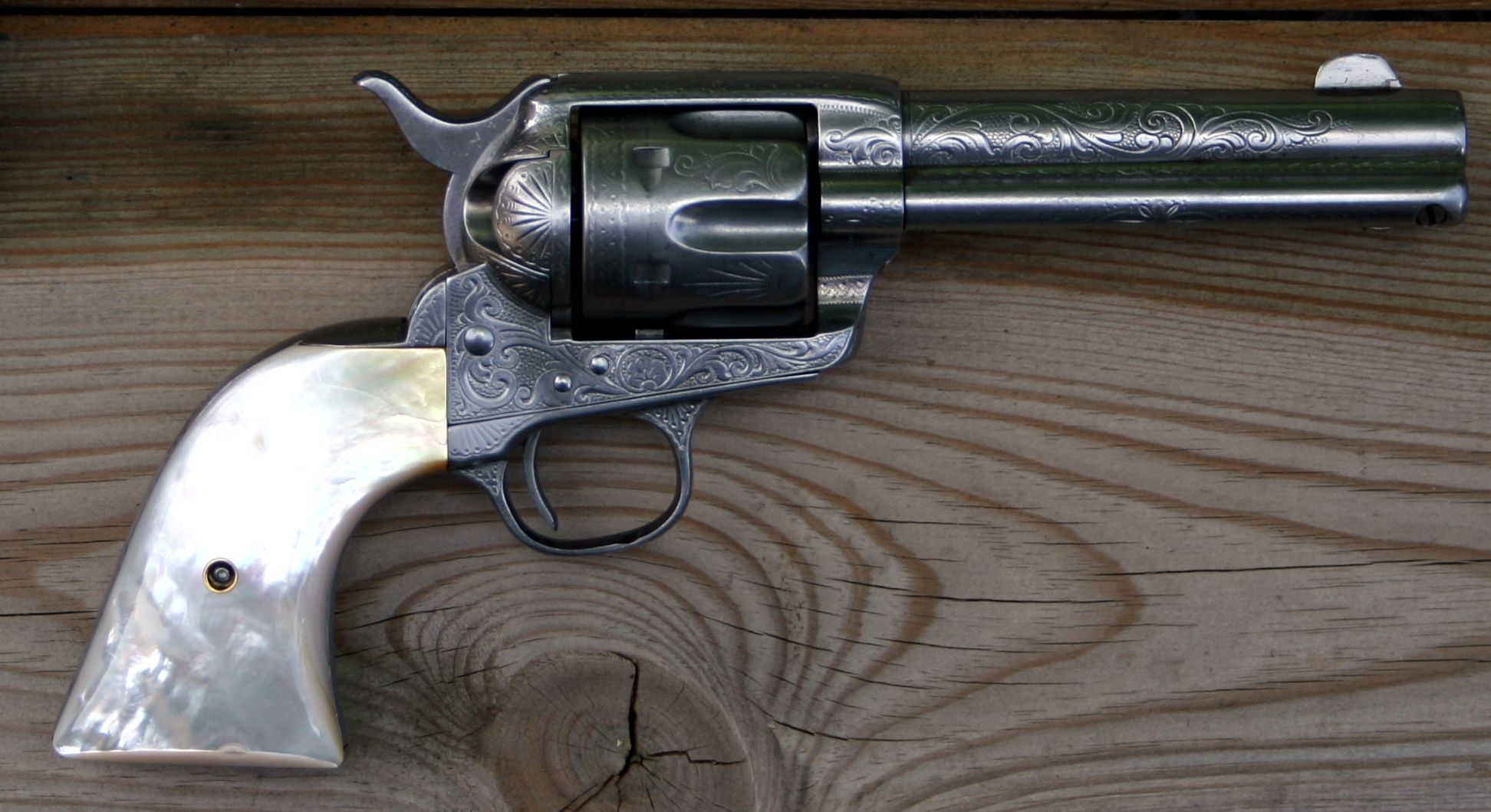
Factory engraved SAA by Cuno Helfricht, shipped 1893 to E. J. Post & Co. Albuquerque NM

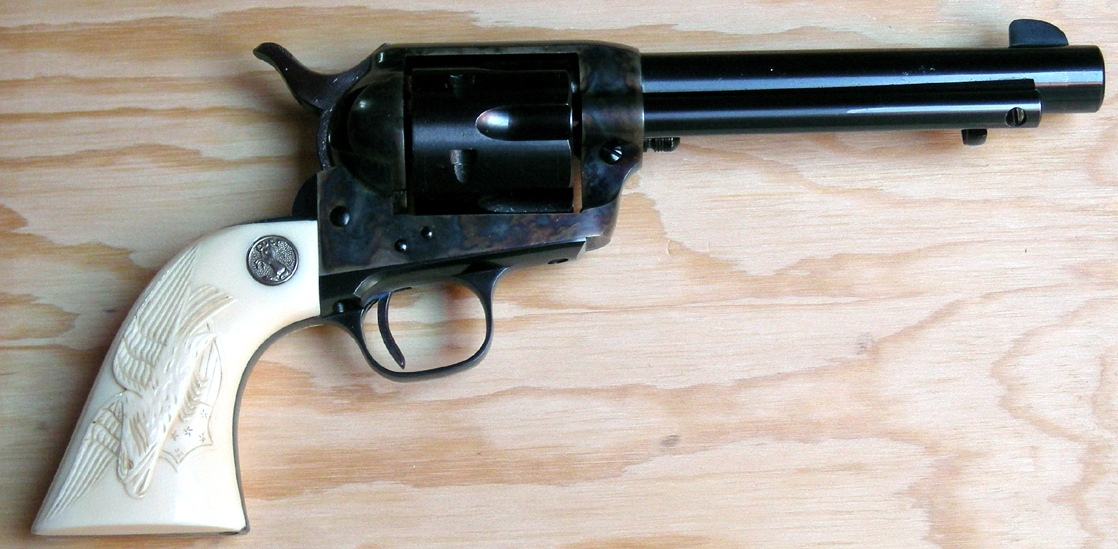
First generation Colt SAA with carved ivory stocks

Colt engraved about one percent of its first-generation production of the Single Action Army revolver, which makes these engraved models extremely rare and valuable with collectors. Engraved pieces were often ordered by or for famous people of the day, including lawmen, heads of state, and captains of industry. This tradition began with the founder, Samuel Colt, who regularly gave such examples away as a means of publicity for Colt.

Colt employed a number of engravers, many of whom were trained artisans who emigrated from Europe. These artisans, such as Gustave Young, Cuno A. Helfricht, Rudolph J. Kornbrath and Louis Daniel Nimschke, were known for inlaying gold, silver, and precious stones in their work. Many of these engraved pieces were adorned with stocks made of ivory or pearl, with engraving and inlays as well.

About 400 of the Second Generation Colt Single Actions were factory-engraved by Colt. The factory engravers of the period were Alvin Herbert, Earl Bieu, Dennis Kies, Robert Burt, Steve Kamyk and Leonard Francolini. One of the most sought-after engravers who have worked on Colt revolvers was Alvin White and the shop of A. A. White Engravers.

== Loading, operation, and instructions for carrying ==
=== Original U.S. Army ===
The original instructions for operation of the Single Action Army, both by Colt and the United States Army Ordnance Corps, specifies the loading of all six chambers and carrying the revolver habitually with the hammer cocked in the safety notch.

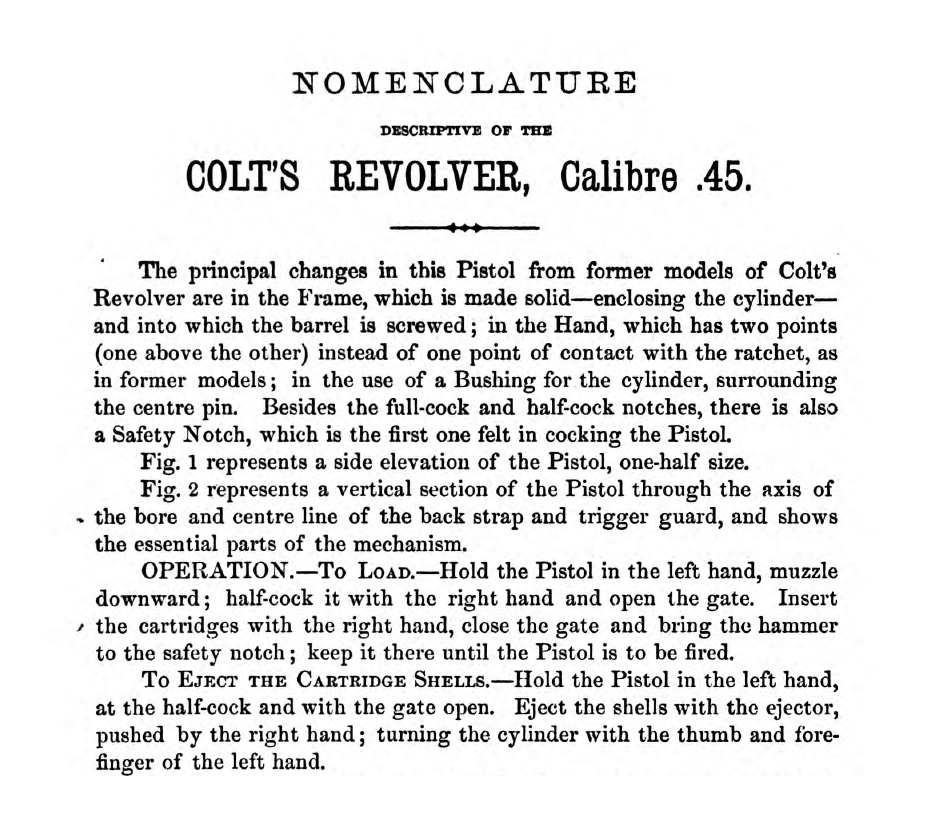
Original loading and operating instructions for the Single Action Army from the 1874 US Army Ordnance Department's Manual

Specifically, the 1874 U.S. Army Ordnance Manual, Description and Rules for the Management of the Springfield Rifle, Carbine, and Army Revolvers, Caliber .45, state "bring the hammer to the safety notch; keep it there until the Pistol is to be fired." as part of the loading instructions.

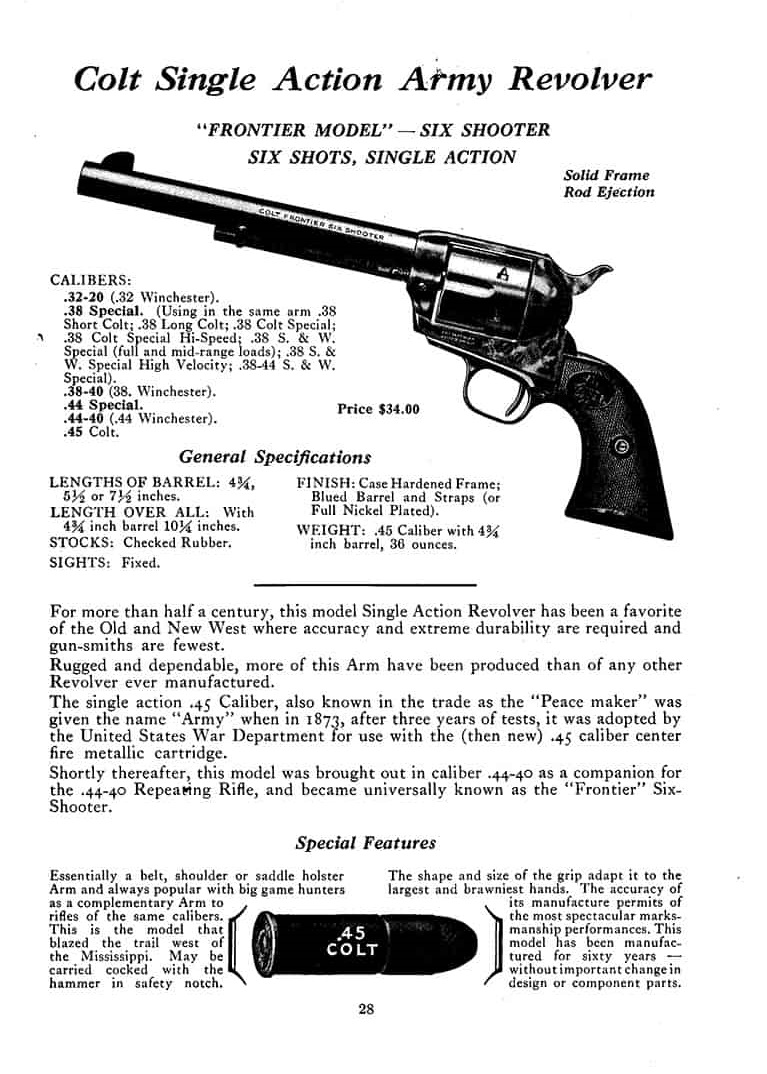
A Single Action Army advertisement c. 1920s-1930s, note the instruction in the bottom left reading "May be carried cocked with the hammer in the safety notch"

=== Commercial ===
Colt continued to provide instructions specifying the revolver was to be carried with all six chambers loaded and with the hammer on the safety notch from 1874 to at least 1945. In 1898, the advertisements for the Single Action Army, 1877, and M1878 all instructed: "These Revolvers should be carried with the hammer resting in the Safety Notch." Colt's advertisements in the 1920s through 1945 (after which the first generation Single Action Armys were discontinued) instructed that the revolver "May be carried cocked with the hammer in the safety notch."

== Mechanics ==
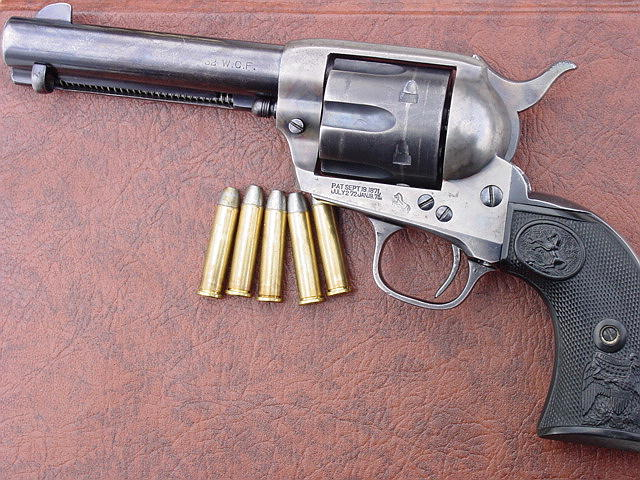
First Generation Single Action Army from 1918, .32 WCF (.32-20)

The Single Action Army action is a refinement of the earlier Colt percussion revolvers and the Colt 1871 cartridge revolver. The cylinder is mounted on a central axis and operated by a hand with a double finger with which more extended action allows the cylinder-ratchet to be cut in a larger circle, giving more torsional force to the cylinder. Four notches on the face of the hammer engage the sear portion of the trigger, affording four basic hammer positions. The hammer rests within the frame when it is fully lowered. Drawn slightly to the rear, the hammer engages the safety notch of the sear and holds the firing pin out of direct contact with a chambered cartridge. Like the earlier percussion revolvers, the Single Action Army was designed to allow loading of all the chambers.

The safety notch replaced pins on the rear of the percussion revolver cylinders, which served the same purpose as the safety position; that is, preventing hammer contact with the primer/percussion cap. According to the original instructions from Colt, as well as the U.S. Army Ordnance Department, the revolver was to be carried with all six chambers loaded and carried with the hammer half-cocked in the safety notch. However, beginning sometime after the Second World War and after the introduction of the Second Generation single action in the 1950s, some gun-writers began strongly advocating the practice of leaving one empty chamber under the hammer. It is likely this was recommended after the Second World War because with the changed tolerances of the re-designed Second Generation Single Action Army, a sharp blow could damage the re-designed half-cock mechanism and allow a fully loaded revolver to fire. Drawn back about halfway, the hammer engages the second notch. This cams the cylinder bolt out of engagement and allows the cylinder to rotate for loading. Fully cocked, the revolver is ready to fire. Cartridge ejection is via the spring-loaded rod housed in a tube on the right side of the barrel.

It is possible to fire the SAA rapidly by holding down the trigger and "fanning" the hammer with the other hand. Ed McGivern dispelled the myth of the inaccuracy of this procedure by shooting tight groups while fanning the revolver.

== Calibers ==
By 1878, the Single Action Army was being offered from the factory in additional calibers for civilian and foreign military sales. Many were sold in .44-40 Winchester Winchester Center Fire (WCF), introduced in 1878 to allow cross-compatibility with the Winchester '73 lever-action rifle; this model was called the "Colt Frontier Six-Shooter", which was etched and later roll-stamped on the left side of the barrel. Additional period calibers for the SAA included .38-40 Winchester introduced in 1884, the .32-20 Winchester introduced in 1884, the .41 Long Colt introduced in 1885, the .38 Long Colt in 1887, the .38 Special and the .357 Magnum in the 20th century. Some of the separately serialized .44 Henry rimfire revolvers were rechambered to .22 rimfire after 1885. The SAA at one time or another was offered in dozens of calibers from .22 rimfire to .476 Eley, though the .45 Colt has always been the most common. A scaled-down .22 rimfire version called the Scout or Frontier Scout was available in the late 20th century.

=== 45 Colt cartridge variations ===
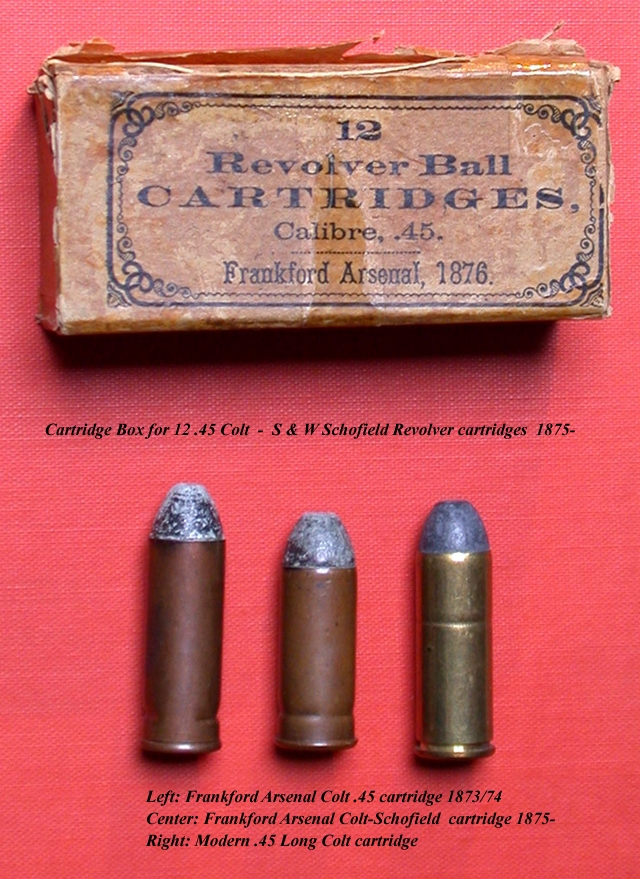
Colt .45 Cartridges

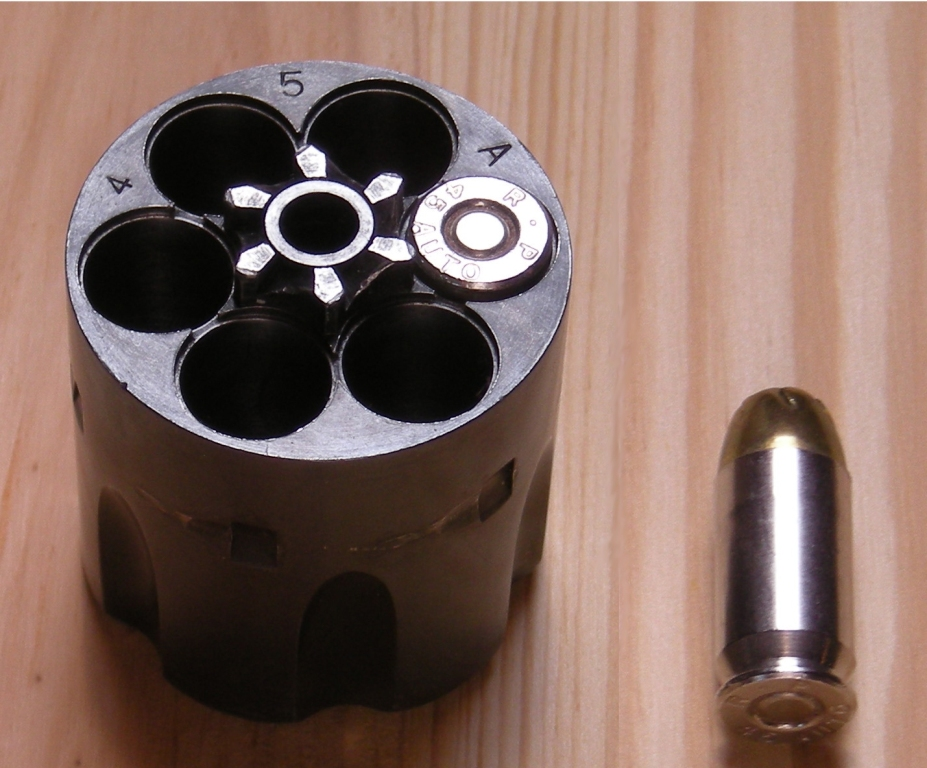
SAA .45 ACP cylinder

The first Colt Single Action Army prototypes were manufactured in .44 American caliber for the 1872 government trials, as the .44 American was the cartridge used in the 1,000 Smith & Wesson Model 3 revolvers issued to the troops. After the tests, the Colt was declared the superior revolver and the government specified that a .45 caliber cartridge would be required. With the adoption of the Colt Single Action Army revolver in 1873, the service cartridges were Copper-cased .45 centerfire Benét inside primed "Colt's Revolver Cartridges" loaded with 30 grains of black powder and an inside lubricated bullet of 250 grain. They were manufactured at Frankford Arsenal, Philadelphia, PA, through 1874. In 1875, the cartridge was shortened so that it would also function in the newly adopted S & W Schofield revolver. It was designated "Revolver Cartridge" and loaded with 28 grains of black powder and a bullet of 230 grain. The Bénet-primed cartridges were manufactured until 1882 and then replaced by reloadable cartridges with brass cases and external primers.

The original .45 Colt black-powder load of 40 grains (2.6 g) propelled a bullet weight of 255 grains (16.5 g) at a nominal 970 feet per second (300 m/s). Authors John Taffin and Mike Venturino have demonstrated that modern black-powder loadings of the .45 Colt cartridge frequently achieve velocities in the vicinity of 1,000 feet per second (300 m/s) with the 7 1/2-inch "cavalry" barrel length, even though modern solid-head cases make it impossible to load a full 40 grains. Specifications for 20th-century smokeless loads set velocity with a 255-grain (16.5 g) round-nosed flat-point bullet at 870 feet per second (270 m/s) providing 429-foot-pound-force (582 J) energy.

The version of the .45 Colt as of 2014 differs from the original cartridge case in that the rim is significantly larger (with a groove immediately above it) and the internal aspect of the primer pocket is surrounded by solid brass instead of protruding into the powder chamber. This "solid head" case is stronger and resists deformation of the primer pocket. Some commercial and custom revolvers and single-shot pistols (such as the Ruger Blackhawk, T/C Contender and others) employ high-pressure loads that are dangerous in the Single Action Army and other vintage arms chambered for the .45 Colt cartridge, especially 19th-century "pre-smokeless" revolvers, which should be fired (if at all) with black powder, only.

Prior to World War II, the .45 Colt used a groove diameter of .454"; post-WWII production adopted the .452" groove diameter of the .45 ACP. From 1924 through 1940, a small number of Single Actions in the pistol caliber .45 ACP were produced. Colt's records list several Single Actions chambered for the .45 Colt cartridge and being accompanied by an extra cylinder for the .45 ACP.

== Legacy ==
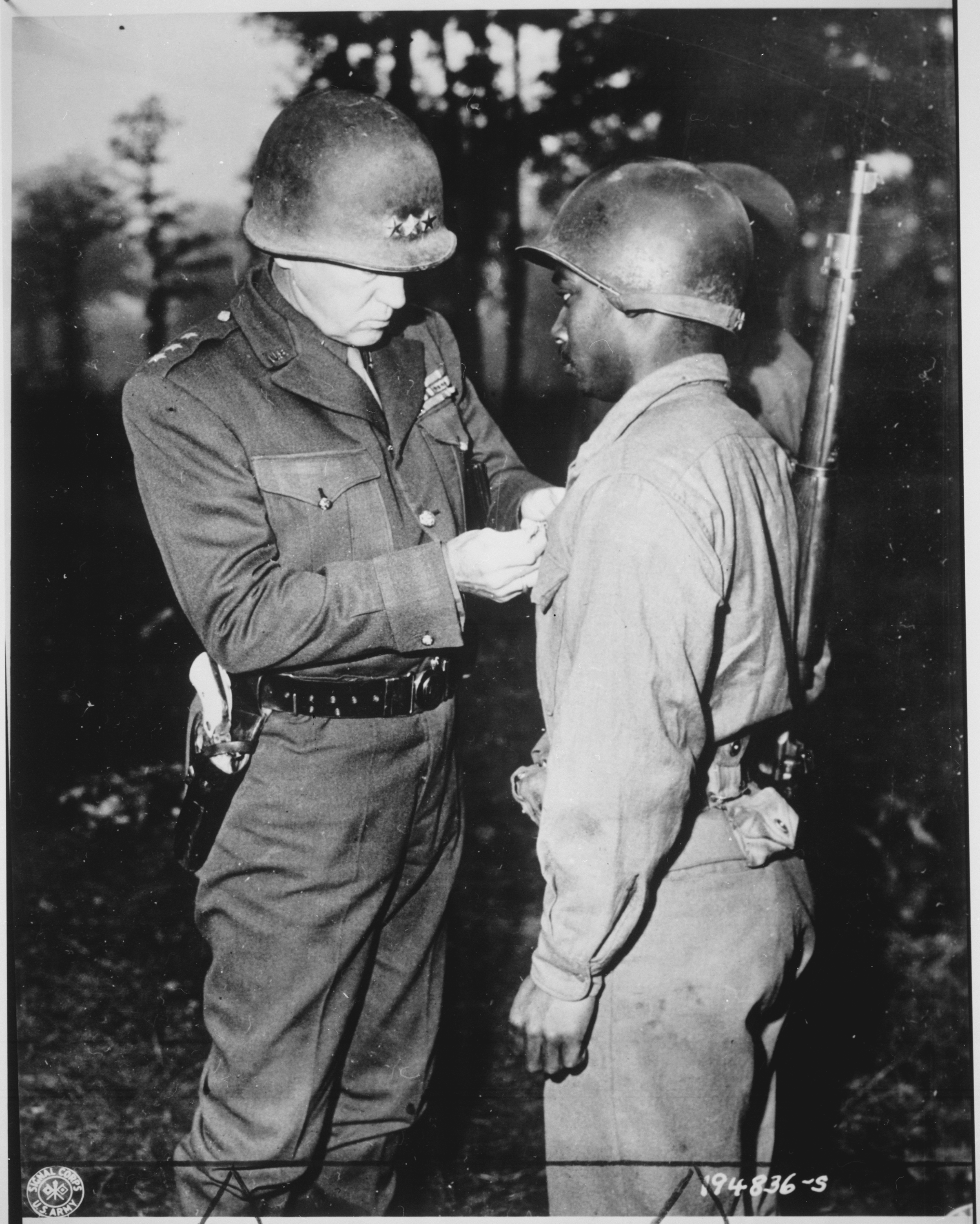
Lt. Gen. George S. Patton Jr. with his ivory-handled Peacemaker

The power, accuracy and handling qualities of the Single Action Army (SAA) made it a popular sidearm from its inception well into the 20th century. The association with the history of the American West remains to the present century, and these revolvers remain popular with shooters and collectors. George S. Patton, who began his career in the horse-cavalry, carried a custom-made SAA with ivory grips engraved with his initials and an eagle, which became his trademark. He used it during the Mexican Punitive Expedition of 1916 in a gunfight with two of Pancho Villa's lieutenants and carried it until his death in 1945 shortly after the end of World War II. It remains on display, along with the SAA carried by actor George C. Scott portraying Patton in the 1970 film by the same name at the General George Patton Museum of Leadership at Fort Knox, KY as of 2022. Villa himself used a 5-inch barrelled Colt Bisley in .44-40 caliber for the full length of his military career.

In the early and mid-20th century, original Peacemakers lacking historical provenance and not in pristine condition were not particularly valuable. They served as raw material for early enthusiasts such as Elmer Keith, Harold Croft and R. F. Sedgley, who modified the revolvers to enhance performance and experimented with more effective ammunition. At the beginning of the 21st century, first- and second-generation SAAs are highly regarded as collector's items and often considered too valuable to shoot.

After World War II, new interest in the SAA started and firearms enthusiast William R. Wilson recognized the need and the opportunity. In 1953 Wilson founded the Great Western Arms Company to produce an almost-exact clone of the old Colt SAA for television and movie westerns. The Great Western revolvers were manufactured in Los Angeles.

Later Colt editions are more common, and various copies and near-copies of the revolver are made by Uberti of Italy. Uberti is now owned by Beretta, producer of the Beretta Stampede. American manufacturers include Colt Manufacturing Company, which still retains the model in its catalog. Until its dissolution in 2017, U.S. Fire Arms Mfg. Co. built several variations true to the original first- and second-generation specifications. STI International has introduced a very precisely made Single Action Army with a modified hand/spring assembly designed to last longer than the originals.

The Single Action Army is the precursor and inspiration for modern sporting revolvers from John Linebaugh, Freedom Arms, Ruger, Cimarron, and others.

In 2010, Arizona State Rifle and Pistol Association President Noble C. Hathaway and Cast Bullet Director Dan Walliser surveyed state residents to determine what "Old West" firearm should be named the official state firearm. The Colt Patent Firearms Single Action Army won by a 38% margin. Afterwards, Hathaway submitted a bill to the Arizona legislature, and on the last day of the 2010–2011 regular legislative session, Arizona Senate Bill 1610 was passed. Governor Jan Brewer signed the bill into law. Arizona is the second state to have an official firearm, following Utah's adoption of the Colt M1911 pistol.

== See also ==
- Colt Model 1871-72 Open Top, the direct ancestor of the Colt Single Action Army
- Magnum Research BFR
- Table of handgun and rifle cartridges

== Bibliography ==
- Adler, Dennis (2008). Colt Single Action: From Patersons to Peacemakers. Edison, NJ: Chartwell Books. ISBN 978-0-7858-2305-6.
- Flayderman, Norm (2001). Flayderman's Guide to Antique American Firearms ... and Their Values. Iola, WI: Krause Publications. ISBN 0-87349-313-3.
- McGivern, Ed (2007). Ed McGivern's Book of Fast and Fancy Revolver Shooting. Skyhorse Publishing Inc. ISBN 978-1-60239-086-7.
- Sapp, Rick (2007). Standard Catalog of Colt Firearms. F+W Media, Inc. ISBN 978-0-89689-534-8.
- Smith, WHB (1968). Book of Pistols and Revolvers. Harrisburg, PA: Stackpole Books.
- Taffin, John (2002). Big Bore Handguns. Iola, WI: Krause Publications. ISBN 978-0-87349-463-2.
- Taffin, John (2005). Single Action Sixguns. Krause Publications. ISBN 978-0-87349-953-8.
- Wilson, R.L. (1979). Colt Heritage: The Official History of Colt Firearms from 1836 to the Present. New York: Jane's Information Group. ISBN 978-0-7106-0004-2.
- Wilson, R.L. (1985). Colt: An American Legend. New York: Abbeville Press. ISBN 978-0-89660-011-9.
- Wilson, R.L. (1992). Peacemakers: Arms and Adventure in the American West. Edison, NJ: Chartwell Publications. ISBN 978-0-7858-1892-2.
- Wilson, R.L. (1995). Steel Canvas: The Art of American Arms. Chartwell Books. ISBN 0-7858-1891-X.
