= Cimarron Firearms =

American firearms importer

- Industry: Arms industry
- Genre: Firearms
- Predecessor: Allen Arms
- Founded: 1984; 42 years ago
- Founder: Mike Harvey
- Headquarters: Fredericksburg, Texas, U.S.
- Products: Replica firearms
- Revenue: US$10 million annually
- Number of employees: 10
- Divisions: Texas Jack's Wild West Outfitters
- Website: cimarron-firearms.com

Cimarron Firearms is an American firearms importer that has been in operation since 1984. The company's field of specialty is reproduction firearms from the American Civil War to the end of the Old West period. Founded by Mike Harvey in Houston, Texas, the company is now based in Fredericksburg, Texas.

Cimarron produces firearms within the industry of western reproduction arms. The firearms are manufactured to their specifications by Uberti and Davide Pedersoli in Brescia, Italy. Uberti makes their revolvers, lever action rifles as well as the 1885 single shot falling block rifle, and shotguns. Pedersoli makes rolling block and falling block single shot rifles to their specifications. In 2011 Cimarron contracted Armscor to manufacture a pre-World War 2 pattern 1911 semiautomatic pistol to their specifications.

Because of the attention to detail given their firearms, Cimarron's revolvers and rifles have been used by weapons masters in a number of Western Films. Additionally, Cimarron markets several of these firearms to collectors in addition to reenactors and competitive shooters. Many of the company's designs have won awards from True West Magazine's "Best of the West".

== History ==
Leonard Frank Allen had started Replica Arms, El Paso, Texas in 1962, with the first Colt 1847 Army replica, made by Armi San Marco. In 1965 he sold Replica Arms and relocated to Santa Fe, New Mexico. Allen then started Western Arms and found himself the subject of a lawsuit brought on by Winchester as "Western Arms" was the name of their ammunition company. Allen renamed the company using his surname.

Cimarron Firearms began in 1977 as a muzzle loading shop and sporting goods store in Houston, Texas, known as "Bigfoot". Mike Harvey, who owned the shop, ordered plans for a Hawken rifle from a museum and built his first replica from scratch. As the economy worsened due to the early 1980s oil depression in Texas, Harvey sought to diversify his stock by selling replica old-west firearms. He entered into a joint venture with Allen Arms importing Uberti revolvers from Italy.

Dissatisfied with quality, as the guns were larger than the historical pieces upon which they were based and were covered with numerous proof marks that detracted from their appearance, Harvey contacted Uberti and sent specific instructions regarding the forging of revolver frames, metal polishing and case hardening. He followed this up by sending antique firearms from the time periods he wanted, and had Uberti build those firearms to his specifications. Finally he had the proof marks relocated to less conspicuous areas of the firearms in keeping with Italian law and enhancing their appearance.

Cimarron was the first firearms company to offer antique finishes on modern made firearms, such as charcoal-bone case hardening. Some finishes are applied in Europe prior to import, and some are applied to bare frames and barrels upon arriving in the US. Firearms author John Taffin has credited Cimarron Arms and its competitor Navy Arms as being instrumental in restoring realism to replica period firearms.

Another finish pioneered by the company was that of antiquated metal with engraving. This gives the appearance of a time-worn antique in a new firearm. The engraving on these revolvers matches the time period in which they were made. Percussion revolvers, for example, feature what is known as the New York or Louis Daniel Nimschke style of engraving from the 1850s, while the Cimarron Model P revolvers are decorated in the later style of Colt's engraver Cuno Helfricht.

The company maintains a retail shop that specializes in period clothing, accessories and Cimarron firearms known as Texas Jack's Wild West Outfitters, named for Texas Jack Omohundro, as Harvey owns several of his firearms. The shop caters primarily to the film industry and Old West reenactors.

== Firearms ==
=== Handguns ===
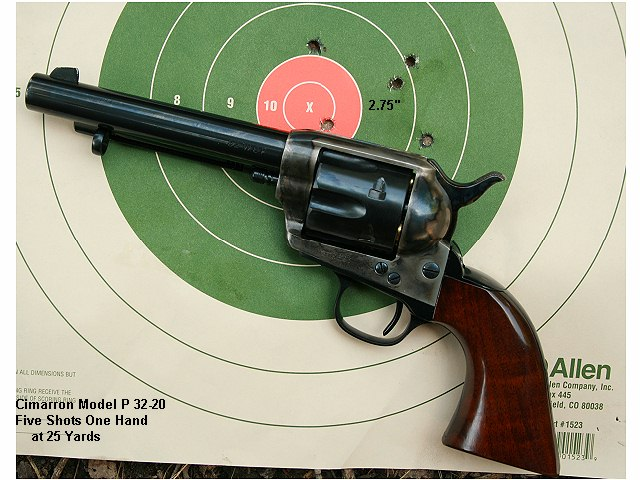
A Uberti-made Cimarron Model P in 32-20/32 WCF

The company's most popular offering is the Model P based on the Colt Peacemaker. One of the first supporters of SASS and Cowboy Action Shooting, Cimarron makes exclusive versions for competitors such as the "Evil Roy" model built to the specs of Gene Pearcey.

Cimarron was the first company to offer a direct copy of the Colt Single Action Army Revolver in stainless steel that maintained the size and dimensions of the original. Some critics have pointed out that the front sight blade is slightly wider and the rear sight notch is slightly narrower than the original Colt's, but that these changes make for a more accurate and easier to sight revolver. Cimarron designed the first sub-4" barrel single-action revolver that used an ejector rod when it introduced the Cimarron Lightning SA model.

In addition to replicas of the Colt Single Action Army Revolver, Cimarron imports exclusive replicas of transition pistols between the eras of blackpowder and cartridge revolvers such as the "Richards" Conversion, "Richards-Mason" Conversion and the Colt Model 1871-72 Open Top revolvers.

In 2011 Cimarron released a copy of the Colt Model 1911 pistol. Made by Armscor in the Philippines the pistol is a replica of the original pre-1923 design for "Wild Bunch" type shooting matches.

The Remington Model 1875 revolver is the most popular non-Colt handgun offered by the company. They briefly offered clones of the Smith & Wesson Schofield revolver, but that model has been discontinued by Cimarron.

=== Long guns ===
Cimarron has two-dozen versions of 19th century rifles built to their specifications by Uberti such as the various Henry rifles and Winchester lever-action carbines such as the 1866 Yellowboy, 1873 Winchester and the Winchester Model 1892. Cimarron's 1873 Trapper is a replica of the Winchester Model 1873 carbine with one exception; the company patented a magazine spring and follower to allow a shooter the ability to load 10 cartridges in the short magazine for competition instead of the standard 9 rounds.

Cimarron offers a replica of the Civil War era Spencer rifle chambered in a centerfire version of its original rimfire loading as well as more commonly available rounds such as .45 Colt.

Aside from repeating rifles, Cimmaron has exclusive single shot Sharps rifles and High and Low Wall single-shot rifles built by Pedersoli and Uberti. These rifles include many custom features not found on other modern reproductions such as cut rifling that has been polished and lapped for accuracy.

== Movie firearms ==
Some production companies use Cimarron's replica firearms in their films, such as the 2010 remake of True Grit, Unforgiven, Lonesome Dove, Far and Away, The Lone Ranger and Young Guns II because of the attention to detail. In 2010 Cimarron's "Corporate Exhibition Shooter" Joey Dillon trained actor Josh Brolin how to handle single action revolvers authentically and Cimarron provided all the revolvers used in the Jonah Hex film. Over 70 Cimarron firearms were used in Back to the Future Part III and the company provided 26 replica Colt Paterson revolvers for the miniseries James A. Michener's Texas.

A pair of Cimarron Single Action revolvers were used by Leonardo DiCaprio in the 1995 film The Quick and the Dead. They were nickel-plated, engraved and serial numbered as #C06477 and #C06073. Cimarron furnished the working prop guns for AMC's western series Hell on Wheels and the 2003 motion picture Open Range.

Cimarron offers a version of the Colt Buntline revolver named the "Wyatt Earp Buntline" styled after the Uberti version used by Kurt Russell as Wyatt Earp in 1993's Tombstone with a 10" barrel and a silver badge inlaid on the right grip panel. Other movie replicas include the "Holy Smoker" based on the "Hand of God" revolver used by Russell Crowe's character Ben Wade in 3:10 to Yuma and a copy of Clint Eastwood's "Man With No Name" revolver. Critics point out that from a historical perspective this type of conversion had no loading lever and included an ejector rod; however, Cimarron was faithful to the movie version which had a loading lever and lacked an ejector rod.

Cimarron was the first company to import a replica of the Sharps rifle from Quigley Down Under.

== Shooting sports ==
In addition to manufacturing a variety of firearms used in cowboy action shooting, Cimarron sponsors an all female cowboy mounted shooting team called the "Cimarron Firearms Team of World Champions" and was one of the earliest proponents of this sport.

== Best of the West Awards ==
Cimarron's firearms have repeatedly won various "Best of the West" awards from True West Magazine against competing models from Colt, Ruger, and other US arms makers. In 2014 the Cimarron 1883 Double Barrel Shotgun .410 and Cimarron 1887 Hammered Coach Gun won Best Cowboy Action Shotgun for Editor's Choice and Reader's Choice, respectively while the Cimarron 1886 Winchester replica won Best Cowboy Action Rifle. The previous year the 1878 Coach Gun won Best Cowboy Action Shotgun and the Thunderstorm revolver took "Best New Western Gun". In 2012 the company's 1873 Rifle won the "Best Repeating Rifle" category. In 2011 Cimarron's 1873 Replica Lever Action Rifle earned Best Cowboy Action Gun. 2010 saw the company earn Best Firearm of the West with their replica 1876 Winchester NWMP Carbine.

In 2005 and 2006 Cimarron's Richards-Mason 1851 Navy Conversion won the category for Best Cartridge Conversion Revolver Reproduction In 2004 their 1860 Richards-Mason Army conversion won the same category and the company's Model 1873 Single Action Army won Reader's Choice for Best Single Action Army Reproduction, Cimarron took the same award in 2003. Also in 2003 the Cimarron Arms 1872 Open Top and 1851 Navy .36-Caliber won the honors for Best Cartridge Conversion Revolver Reproduction and Best Cap and Ball Revolver Reproduction.
