= Great equalizer =

Great equalizer or The Great Equalizer may refer to:

- the philosophy of Horace Mann, which promoted education as the great equalizer that allowed anyone to improve their life in spite of wealth, status, and privilege
- the Slider (pitch) in baseball, a pitch that is said to neutralize the best hitters
- the Colt Single Action Army handgun, whose firepower was said to equalize the odds between the weak and the strong
- the rule of law, which subjects all people to the same set of rules that are ideally impartial and fair
- Time, which applies to all in equal amounts
- Death, the end of life for all living things, regardless of distinction
