= Guas =

Guas is a surname. Notable people with the name include:

- David Guas (born 1975), American chef and TV personality
- Juan Guas (c. 1430–33 – c. 1496), Spanish artist and architect of French origin
- Rafael Guas Inclán (1896–1975), Cuban politician and vice president of Cuba

== See also ==
- Gūās, an alternate name for Guvas, a village in Iran
