= John Linebaugh =

American gunsmith (1955–2023)

- Born: November 15, 1955; Pickering, Missouri, U.S.
- Died: March 19, 2023 (aged 67); Clark, Wyoming, U.S.
- Occupation: Gunsmith
- Known for: Inventing the .500 Linebaugh and the .475 Linebaugh cartridges

John Linebaugh (November 15, 1955 – March 19, 2023) was an American gunsmith from Cody, Wyoming, known for creating custom firearms. He was the inventor of the .500 Linebaugh (1986) and .475 Linebaugh (1988) cartridges. Gunwriter John Taffin, a big-bore enthusiast, describes Linebaugh as a "pioneer" in developing powerful sixguns.

== Biography ==
John Linebaugh was born on November 15, 1955, in Pickering, Missouri. Linebaugh's early efforts started in the 1970s, where he produced revolvers made to handle much more powerful loadings in .44 Magnum and .45 Colt, and then later on expanded into creating his own cartridge designs. After inventing the .500 Linebaugh and .475 Linebaugh cartridges, he later created a variant of each cartridge, lengthened to 1.61 inches, and appended "Maximum" to their names. Linebaugh focused on developing cartridges which were compatible with standard-size revolvers, keeping them "old school" or "packable" rather than oversize.

Linebaugh died in Clark, Wyoming, on March 19, 2023, at the age of 67. He was laid to rest on March 28, 2023, at the Bennett Butte Cemetery in section 108–5.
