= GWA =

GWA or Gwa may refer to:

== Languages ==
- Gua language (ISO 639-3: gwx), a Guang language of coastal Ghana
- Gwa language (ISO 639-3: gwb), a Jarawan language of northern Nigeria
- Mbato language (ISO 639-3: gwa), a Kwa language of Ivory Coast and Ghana

== Science ==
- GWA study or GWAS, Genome-wide association study
- GW approximation, in quantum field theory

== Places ==
- Gwa, Myanmar, a town
- Gwa Township, Myanmar, which includes the town

== Organizations ==
- Game Workers Alliance, trade union of the video game company Activision Blizzard
- Gay Women's Alternative, in Washington, DC, United States
- Georgia Writers Association, in the United States
- Global Workspace Alliance, a trade organization
- Global Wesleyan Alliance, a Methodist organization
- German World Alliance, a worldwide organization of the Germans abroad
- George Walton Academy, a private school in Monroe, Georgia, United States
- George Washington Academy, an American school in Morocco
- Georgia Women of Achievement, an organization in the United States
- Golden West Airlines, a defunct American airline
- Great Western Arms Company, a defunct American firearms manufacturer
- GWA Group, an Australian company
- One Rail Australia, an Australian rail freight operator formerly known as Genesee & Wyoming Australia
