= Guhe =

Guhe may refer to the following locations in China:

- Guhe, Quanjiao County (古河镇), town in Anhui
- Guhe, Funing County, Jiangsu (古河镇), town
- Guhe, Gaotang County (固河镇), town in Shandong
- Guhe Township, Dahua County (古河乡), in Dahua Yao Autonomous County, Guangxi
- Guhe Township, Laoting County (古河乡), Hebei

== See also ==
- Guha (disambiguation)
