= Guha =

Guha may refer to:

- Guha (surname), including a list of people with the name
- Guha, a name of the Hindu god Kartikeya
- Guha (film), a 1981 Malayalam film
- Guha (Ramayana), a character in the Hindu epic

== See also ==
- Guhe (disambiguation)
- Guhan, Iran, a village
