= Great Western Arms Company =

American firearms manufacturer

- Type: Private
- Industry: Firearms
- Founded: 1954
- Defunct: 1964
- Fate: Dissolved
- Headquarters: Los Angeles, California, United States
- Products: Copy of the Colt Single Action Army Revolver

The Great Western Arms Company (GWA) was founded in Los Angeles, California in 1953 to produce an American-made copy of the Colt Single Action Army Revolver. Colt had discontinued this model in 1940. The Great Western revolver was sold by mail order in the 1950s and early 1960s, and was used in many Western movies and television shows.

== History ==
Colt’s model 1873 single action “Peacemaker” revolver was iconic by the early 20th century as the ‘gun that won the West’. Colt continued to produce it through the 1930s though it was by then functionally antiquated compared to modern revolvers and pistols. Sales dwindled to almost nothing in the Depression, and when WWII broke out in Europe, Colt dropped the SAA to focus production resources on its military arms contracts.

After the war, film and television spurred renewed interest in the SAA but Colt was not immediately persuaded to resume production. In the Los Angeles area an enterprise to produce an SAA copy coalesced around Northrup engineer William R. Wilson, mail-order impresario Hy Hunter, and several firearm professionals from nearby Weatherby. This group started production of the Great Western Arms Frontier SAA revolver in 1954.

The Great Western Arms enterprise operated for about ten years, but never overcame domestic and foreign competitors that also introduced western style revolvers. The business was beset by regular insolvencies, and was twice surrendered to vendors holding account receivables. Los Angeles Rams executive Dan Reeves and Rams team physician Dan Fortmann are understood to have been the company's first capital investors, and Wilson’s backer [2][3]. The last proprietor was EMF Co, which still operates today as a firearms retailer.

Over the 1954-64 period Great Western made about 22000 revolvers and 3300 derringers. Great Western's single action revolver was mostly identical to Colt's original version, save for a few modern improvements. It was notably identifiable for its stag pattern plastic grips. It was available in popular revolver calibers. Great Western's derringer was also a faithful reproduction, that of the Remington model 95.

== Marketing and use in films ==
Wilson and Hunter courted spokesmen endorsers as they rolled out the Great Western Frontier revolver in 1954, and the gun became somewhat known for its association with 1950s Hollywood western film and TV production.

John Wayne appeared on the company’s catalogs through its entire run. He was presented with two sets of engraved revolvers, one of these sets he used later in the 1976 film The Shootist. Audie Murphy and Mel Torme were other endorsers.

A specially made Great Western revolver was built for Don Knotts in the Disney movie, The Shakiest Gun in the West; this revolver would comically fall apart when cocking the hammer.

In 1955 Wilson sent unsolicited to President Eisenhower an ornately engraved .38 revolver and a similar model to California Governor Goodwin J. Knight.

== Bibliography ==
- John C. Dougan; Jim Hoobler (2012). Great Western Arms Company: Revolvers & Derringers Manufactured from 1954 to 1964. Woonsocket, RI: Andrew Mowbray Publishers. ISBN 978-1-931464-51-2.
