= Smith & Wesson Model 3 =

Single-action, cartridge-firing, top-break revolver

Smith & Wesson No. 3 Revolver
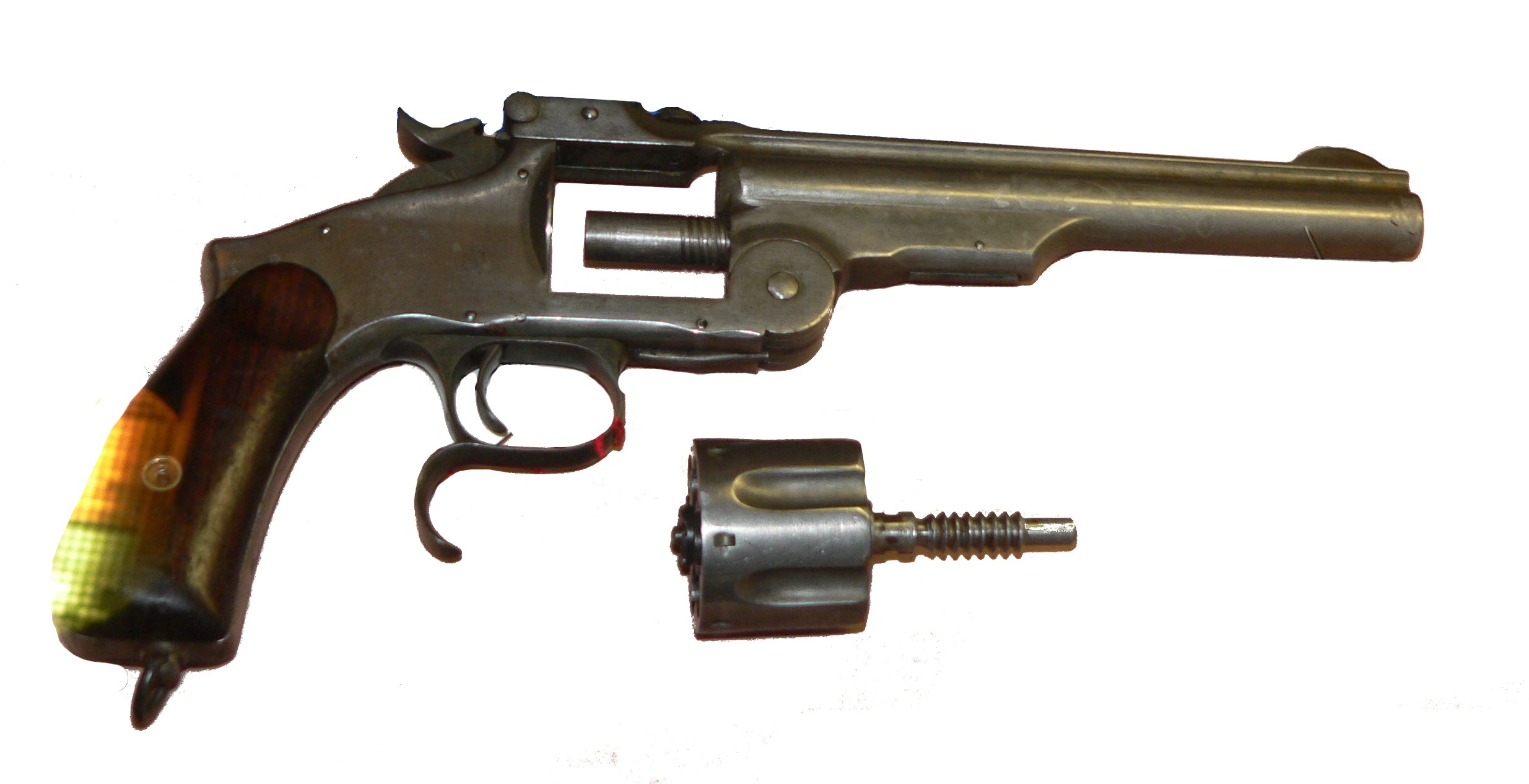
- Type: Service revolver
- Place of origin: United States

Service history
- In service: 1870–1915
- Used by: United States; Soviet Russia; Russian Empire; Kingdom of Montenegro; Argentina; Empire of Japan; Ottoman Empire; Qing dynasty North-West Mounted Police; South Australia Police; Spain; Second Polish Republic; Canada; Australia; Portugal
- Wars: American Indian Wars; Russo-Turkish War (1877–78); Qing reconquest of Xinjiang; North-West Rebellion; Spanish–American War; Philippine–American War; Russo-Japanese War; World War I Russian Civil War; Polish–Ukrainian War; Rif War (Eibar copies)

Production history
- Designer: Smith & Wesson
- Manufacturer: Smith & Wesson, Ludwig Loewe & Company, Tula Arsenal
- Produced: 1868–1898

Specifications
- Mass: 1.3 kilograms (2.9 lb)
- Length: 305 millimetres (12.0 in)
- Barrel length: 165 millimetres (6.5 in)
- Cartridge: .44 Russian, .44 S&W American, .38 S&W, .44 Henry, .44-40 Winchester, .45 Schofield, .32 S&W
- Action: Single-action
- Feed system: 6-round cylinder
- Sights: Fixed front post and rear notch

The Smith & Wesson Model 3 is a single-action, cartridge-firing, top-break revolver produced by Smith & Wesson (S&W) from around 1870 to 1915, and was recently again offered as a reproduction by Smith & Wesson and Uberti.

It was produced in several variations and subvariations, including both the "Russian" model, so named because it was supplied to the military of the Russian Empire (41,000 No. 3s were ordered in .44 caliber by the Imperial Russian Army in 1871), and the "Schofield" model, named after Major George W. Schofield, who made his own modifications to the Model 3 to meet his perceptions of the cavalry's needs. S&W incorporated these modifications into an 1875 design they named after the major, planning to obtain significant military contracts for the new revolver.

The Model 3 was originally chambered for the .44 S&W American and .44 Russian cartridges, and typically did not have the cartridge information stamped on the gun (as is standard practice for most commercial firearms). Model 3 revolvers were later produced in an assortment of calibers, including .44 Henry Rimfire, .44-40, .32-44, .38-44, and .45 Schofield. The design influenced the smaller S&W .38 Single Action that is retroactively referred to as the Model 2.

== Russian model ==
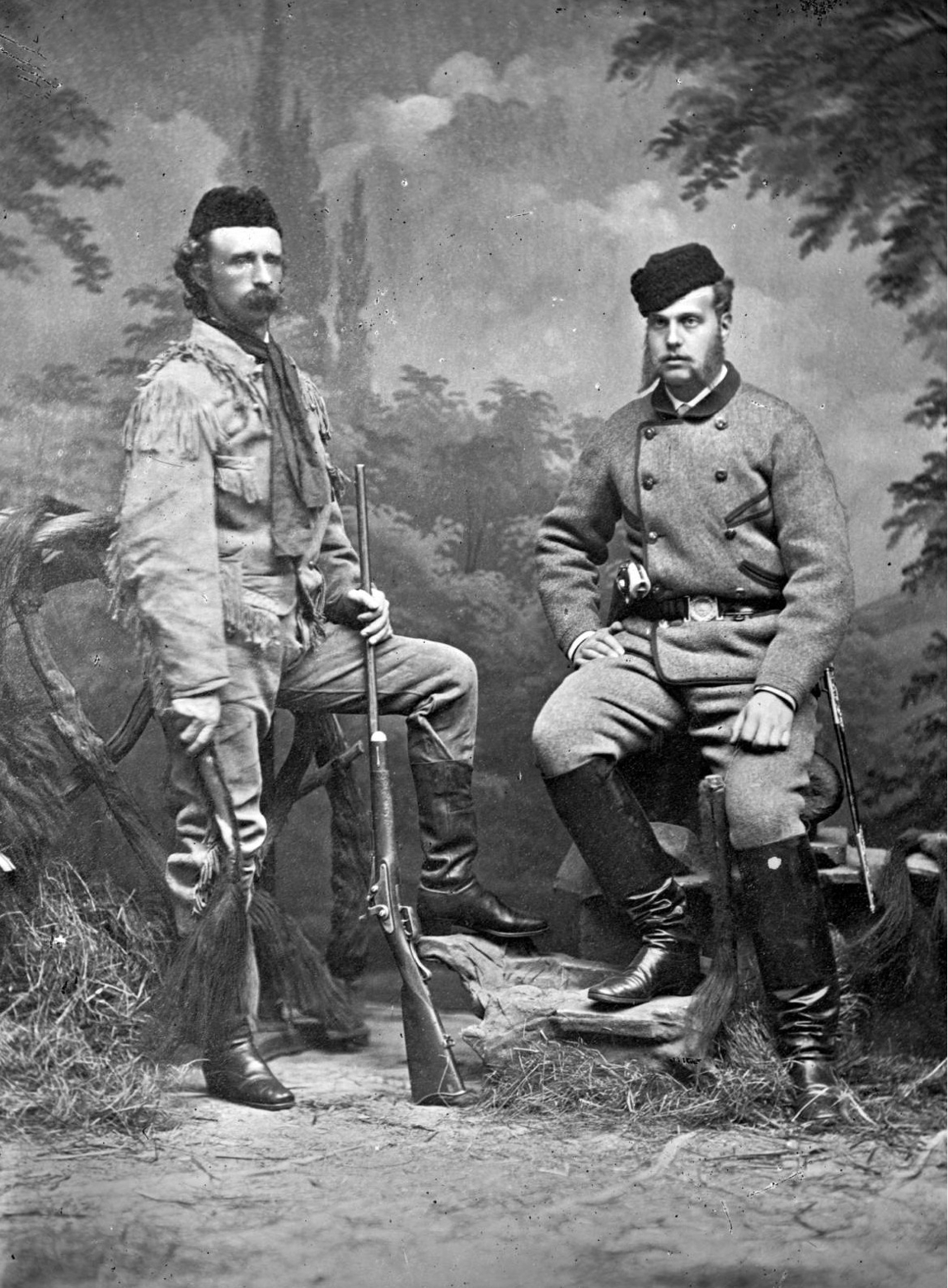
George Armstrong Custer with Grand Duke Alexei Alexandrovich of Russia after the Duke's 1872 buffalo hunt. The Duke has his new Smith & Wesson No. 3 in the holster.

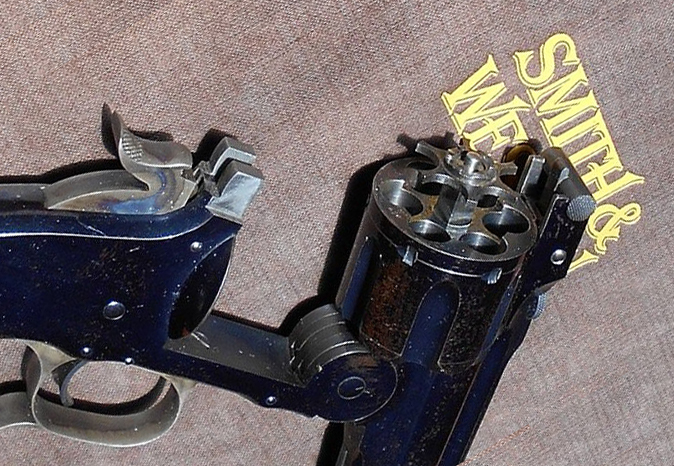
Smith & Wesson No. 3, open for loading: The automatic ejector is up.

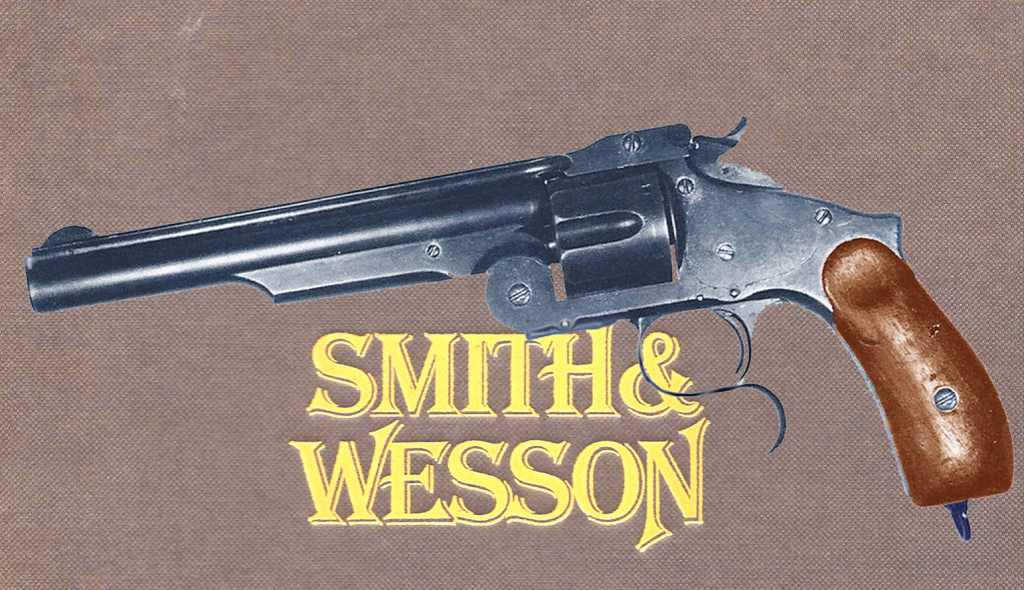
S&W Russian Model No. 3

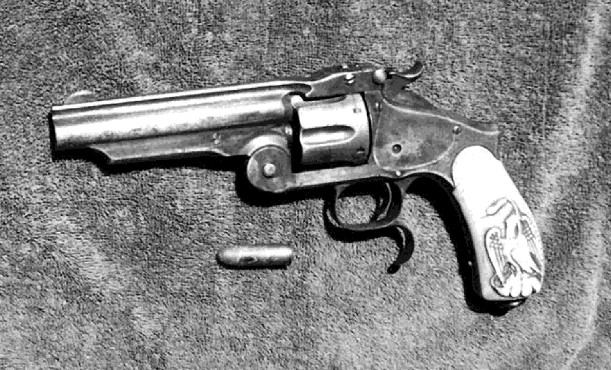
Emiliano Zapata's No.3, captured by Emil Lewis Holmdahl. Zapata's name is scratched on the ivory handle.

Smith & Wesson produced large numbers of the Model 3, in three distinct models, for the Russian Empire by special order. The first was the 1st Model Russian (the original order design), with the Russian Ordnance Inspector mandating a number of improvements to the design, resulting in the 2nd Model Russian, with a final revision to the Russian design being known as the 3rd Model Russian.

== Schofield revolver ==
The U.S. Army adopted the .44 S&W American caliber Model 3 revolver in 1870, making it the first standard-issue, cartridge-firing revolver in U.S. service. Most military pistols until that point were black powder cap-and-ball revolvers, which were (by comparison) slow, complicated, and susceptible to the effects of wet weather.

In 1875, the U.S. Ordnance Board granted S&W a contract to outfit the military with Model 3 revolvers incorporating the design improvements of Major George W. Schofield (the so-called "Schofield revolvers"), providing that they could make the revolvers fire the .45 Colt (or ".45 Long Colt") ammunition already in use by the US military. S&W instead developed their own, slightly shorter .45 caliber round, the .45 Schofield, otherwise known as the .45 S&W.

When it became obvious in the field that the two cartridges would not work interchangeably in the Schofield (although they both worked in the Colt), the U.S. government adopted the shorter .45 Schofield cartridge as the standard cartridge. Despite the change, old stocks of the longer .45 Colt rounds in the supply line caused the Army to drop most of the Schofields and continue with the Colt. Major Schofield had patented his locking system and earned a payment on each gun that S&W sold; and at the time, his older brother, John M. Schofield, was the head of the Army Ordnance Board, so this conflict-of-interest may have been the main reason for the adoption of the .45 Schofield.

Many of the Model 3 Schofield revolvers served in the Indian Wars, with reports of them in use as late as the Spanish–American War and Philippine–American War. Like the other Model 3s, they were also reportedly popular with lawmen and outlaws in the American West and were reportedly used by Jesse James, Bob Ford (who used one to kill James), John Wesley Hardin, Pat Garrett, Theodore Roosevelt, Virgil Earp, Billy the Kid, and many others. The S&W No. 3 revolver was famously used by Wyatt Earp during the gunfight at the O.K. Corral with the Clanton Gang.

While the standard barrel length was 7 inches, many Schofields were purchased as surplus by distributors, had the barrels shortened to 5 inches, and were refinished in nickel. After the Spanish–American War of 1898, the US Army sold off all their surplus Schofield revolvers, which were reconditioned by wholesalers and gunsmiths (at professional factory-quality level), with a considerable number offered for sale on the commercial market with a 5-in. barrel, as well as the standard size barrel of 7 in.

One of the most notable purchasers of these reconditioned Model 3 Schofield revolvers was Wells Fargo and Company, which purchased the revolvers for use by Wells Fargo agents and had the barrels shortened to a more concealable 5-in length. These revolvers were then inspected by the Wells Fargo armorer and uniquely stamped "W.F. & Co" or "Wells Fargo & Co", along with the original Smith & Wesson serial number restamped alongside the Wells Fargo stamping on the flat part of the barrel just forward of the barrel pivot, as well as restamping any part of each revolver that had not originally been stamped or stamped in a location that would be difficult to view the serial number, when needed.

The Wells Fargo Schofield revolvers became so popular with collectors from the 1970s onwards that the unique Wells Fargo markings were being "counterfeited" or "faked" by unscrupulous sellers to enhance the value of other similar versions that had not been genuinely owned by Wells Fargo & Co. More "fake" Wells Fargo-marked Schofield revolvers than genuine ones are in existence, and accordingly, a collector interested in purchasing a "Wells Fargo" Schofield revolver would be well advised to have a pre-purchase inspection and verification performed by an expert who specializes in this model.

Lieutenant Colonel Schofield shot himself on December 17, 1882, with a Schofield revolver after suffering a bout of mental illness, stress, and isolation.

An engraved, gold-plated New Model No. 3 with pearl grips was presented to sharpshooter Annie Oakley in the 1890s by her husband Frank Butler. The revolver was one of three embellished guns that were cased for Oakley as a presentation group.

=== Versions ===
The First Model Schofield has a latch configuration that is rather pointed at the top and has a circle around the screw head at the bottom.

The Second Model latch has a large raised circle at the top of the latch.

One of Major Schofield's revisions and improvements to the predecessor Model 3 revolvers included mounting the spring-loaded barrel catch on the frame as opposed to the standard Model 3, which has the latch mounted on the barrel. In the previous engineering, the posts of the frame would wear out after heavy usage. Schofield's improvement called for heat-treated, replaceable components at this sensitive "wear" area of the catch and latch. The serial number range also indicates whether it is a First or Second Model, with the serial numbers changing from the First Model to the Second Model at a little over 3,000.

==== New Model No. 3 ====
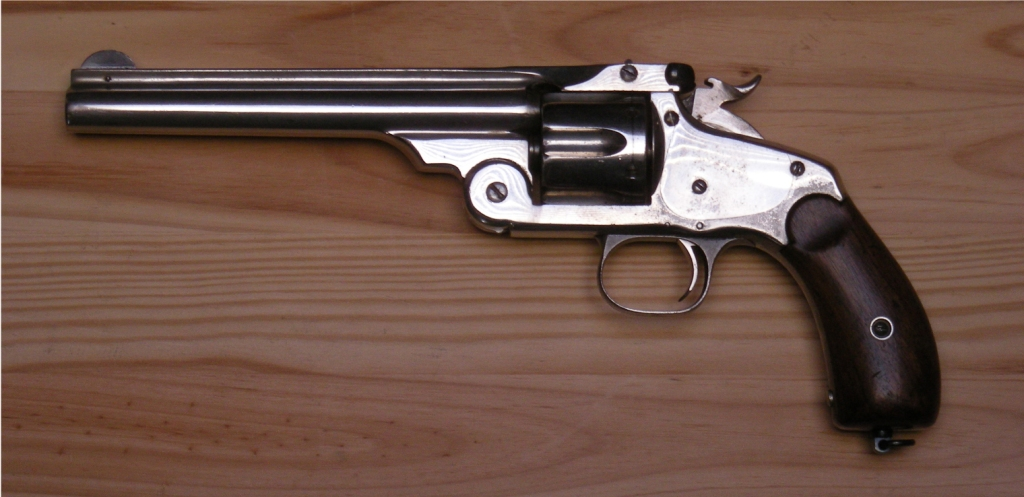
Smith & Wesson No. 3, New Model, 44 Russian

In 1877, S&W discontinued production of its other Model 3s, such as the American, Russian, and Schofield, in favor a new improved design called the New Model No. 3. This new model was originally offered in the same frame and cylinder lengths as the original No: 3 but soon, Smith and Wesson offered a "Frontier" version with a longer frame and cylinder, allowing it to fire the longer WCF (44-40) cartridges. Standard chambering was .44 Russian (barrels were often stamped 44 S&W and was Smith and Wesson's attempt to re-brand the 44 Russian cartridge), although other calibers were available on special order or in related models such as the .44-40 Frontier model, the .32-44 and .38-44 Target models, and the very rare .38-40 Winchester model.

==== Australian Model ====
In 1880, the South Australia Police, which were then interested in rearming with up-to-date weapons, noted a display of New Model No. 3 revolvers at the Australian Exposition in Melbourne. At the direction of Police Commissioner Peterswald, an order was placed through S&W's New York agent for 250 nickel revolvers in .44 Russian with a 7-in barrel length. The order, which included extension shoulder stocks, ammunition, and reloading kits, arrived at Adelaide in March 1882. The revolvers and stocks were thereupon marked with a government broad-arrow punch mark and were called revolver-carbines. They were issued to mounted police, known as troopers, who at that period also policed the Northern Territory. Both the South Australia and Western Australia police made further small purchases during 1886–88, none of which was marked with the broad arrow. For some 30 years, the revolver-carbine was the front-line weapon of the mounted police of S.A., W.A., and N.T. Nearly all serial numbers are known, and are listed in the book Service Arms of the South Australian Police. The S.A. revolvers were sold as surplus in 1953 to the Western Arms Corporation of Los Angeles.

==== 1st Model .44 Double Action ====
Often improperly referred to as a "New Model 3 Double Action", the 1st Model .44 Double Action is not a Model 3 production or variation, but rather a stand-alone model.

== Copies ==
The popular Model 3 was copied in many countries. Licensed production for the Russian order was carried out first by Ludwig Loewe & Company of Germany and, since 1886, by the Tula Arsenal in Russia, whereas counterfeit copies were made in Spain, Mexico, and Belgium. Copies have been found in Turkey and Pakistan, as well, made by local manufacturers.

=== 11mm Orbea Hermanos y Cia. M1884 Sistema ONÁ ("S&W Model 7") ===
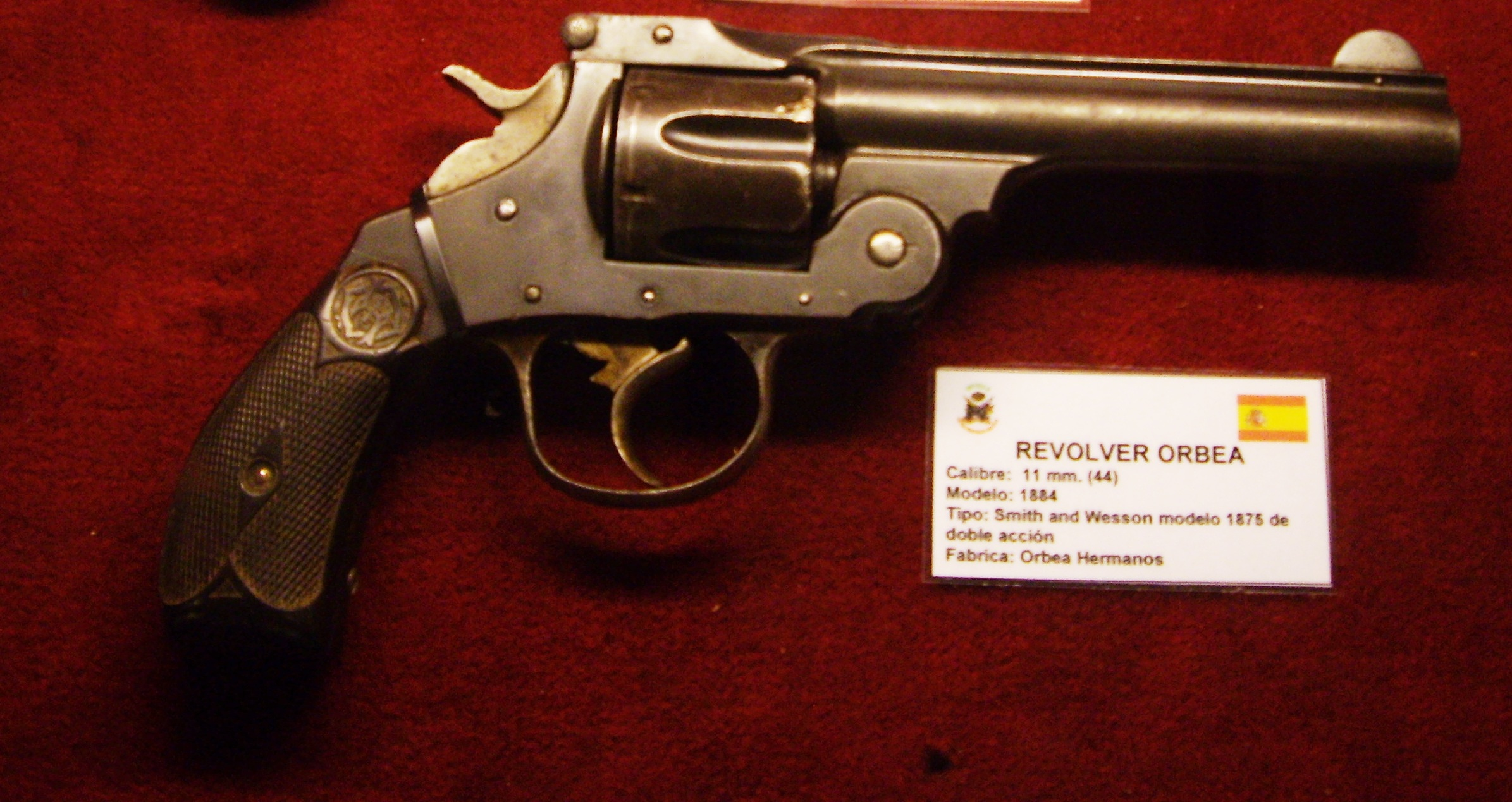
An Orbea Hermanos revolver at the Seville Military History Museum

In 1884, the Spanish government made a decree stating that any invention not copyrighted by their copyright office was not under their protection. One victim of this was S&W, whose lucrative contract to produce Model 3 revolvers for the Spanish Army was quickly cancelled. Its work given to local gunsmiths in Eibar by different firms without any standardization of parts.

The Orbea Hermanos Modelo 1884 Sistema ONÁ (Basque oná > "good") or "S&W Model 7" revolver was made from 1884 until the 1920s. It is notable for its grip medallion, which is an "OH" interlaced like the Smith & Wesson "S&W".

An interesting footnote is that S&W immediately copyrighted all of their other designs in Spain from then on. That is why their firearms have MARCA REGISTRADA and the date of the Spanish patent on their barrels.

=== Liege copies ===
Several unauthorized Belgian copies were made in .44 Russian and .44-40 Winchester as single- and double-action revolvers. These copies, mostly manufactured in Liege, were marked as if to deceive a buyer into thinking that they were a revolver produced by Smith & Wesson. Many of the finer details, such as the location of the S&W factory, were incorrectly stamped on the revolvers ("New York" and "VK" being the two most common).

Smith & Wesson brought lawsuits against two gunmakers in Liege, which they originally lost, but won on appeal.

=== Users ===
==== Italy ====
The prime contractor for the Italian military was Orbea, which chambered their revolvers for the Italian 10.4 mm cartridge. These Spanish-made revolvers were used during World War I, and were the preferred handgun of elite Arditi troops.

==== Romania ====
Revolvers for the Romanian military were chambered for the .44 Russian cartridge, and were made by Trocaola, Aranzabal y Cía. These Spanish-made revolvers were used during World War I.

==== Spain ====
Spain used these revolvers, which were chambered for the .44 Russian cartridge, during the Philippine Revolution, the Spanish–American War, the Rif War, and the Spanish Civil War.

==== United Kingdom ====
The M1884 was later briefly made chambered in .455 Webley for British government contracts in 1915 and 1916. It was designated by the British Army as the "Pistol, Old Pattern", due to its old design. They were dubbed "Spanish Webleys" by troops, though they were copies of the S&W Model 3. Orbea Hermanos y Cia., Garate, Anitua y Cia., and Trocaola, Aranzabal y Cia. were contracted to make 30,000 revolvers among them. Orbea Hermanos was the major contractor and the other two were subcontractors. Rexach & Urgoite was later contracted in 1916 to make 500 pistols, but all failed proofing and the lot was refused.

Finish and quality control varied throughout the run of production. The fact that they were making service pistols and revolvers for France and Italy at the same time was definitely a factor.

As no standardization of design or parts existed between manufacturers, each manufacturer's model was considered a different gun altogether. The Garate, Anitua y Cia. model was designated the Pistol, Old Pattern, No.1 Mk.I, the Trocaola, Aranzabal y Cia. model was designated the Pistol, Old Pattern, No.2 Mk.I, and the Orbea Hermanos model was designated the Pistol, Old Pattern, No.3 Mk.I.

The weapons were given to the Royal Ulster Constabulary after the war. The RUC later sold them off to the New South Wales Police Force, who made snub-nosed revolvers out of them and issued them as backup pistols. A cut-down, snub-nosed .455 "Old Pattern" revolver was carried by one of Michael Collins' bodyguards.

== Modern reproductions ==
Modern reproductions of the Model 3 revolver are made by several companies, including (most notably) Smith & Wesson themselves, as well as the Italian arms-makers Uberti and Armi San Marco.

=== Smith & Wesson ===
S&W manufactured a modern reproduction of the original Model 3 revolvers from 2000 to 2003. Despite being touted as a "true" reproduction, significant differences exist between the modern version and the original. A side-by-side comparison of an original with the preproduction gun showed that the new version is slightly more stout than the original around the barrel and top strap, though not as much as on the Navy Arms guns. Changes in the internal lock mechanism were also made.

The "reproduction" S&W Model 3 firing pin is frame-mounted instead of being an integral part of the hammer, a modern safety feature – with a transfer bar as a practical safety catch in a revolver, to prevent accidental discharge if dropped.

No transfer bar is on the firing pin, but a blocking bar is on the hammer, should it slip off the thumb when cocking the pistol. A heavier cylinder was fitted into the stronger frame. Unlike the Uberti reproductions that have a longer-than-original cylinder and frame, the S&W was made to only accommodate the shorter original Schofield rounds.

=== Uberti/Armi San Marco ===
A modern reproduction from Uberti

The Uberti version, imported by Navy Arms and Cimarron Firearms, has external dimensions generally similar to the original 2nd Model Schofield, but the barrel and top strap are considerably thicker, for additional strength. These replica Model 3 revolvers have lengthened cylinders to accommodate .45 Colt and .44-40 cartridges. Although some problems arose with the locking latch angles in early versions, these were generally corrected or the revolvers were replaced. European reproduction Model 3 revolvers have changes made to their lockwork to meet import regulations. A Uberti produced reproduction was also marketed as the Beretta Laramie.

== Cultural significance ==
- Clint Eastwood's 1992 film Unforgiven features an amateur bounty hunter called the "Schofield Kid" (Jaimz Woolvett), named after the Model 3, his weapon of choice. Eastwood's character uses the Kid's Schofield in the movie's final gunfight.
- In the 2007 film 3:10 to Yuma, Charlie Prince (Ben Foster) carries two S&W Schofield Model 3 revolvers as his personal sidearms.
