= Le Gua =

Le Gua is the name of 2 communes in France:

- Le Gua, Charente-Maritime
- Le Gua, Isère
