= Louis D. Nimschke =

- Born: Louis Daniel Nimschke; July 4, 1832; Germany
- Died: April 9, 1904 (aged 71); Brooklyn, New York, United States
- Occupation(s): Gunsmith, engraver

Louis Daniel Nimschke (July 4, 1832 – April 29, 1904) was a master firearms engraver of the 19th century who engraved over 5,000 firearms between 1850 and 1904 for Colt's Patent Fire Arms Co., Winchester, Remington, Sharps, Smith & Wesson, Henry, Marlin Firearms and Stevens Arms.

== Early life ==
Born in Germany in 1832, Nimschke moved to the United States in 1850 at the age of 18 and began engraving jewelry, silverware, watch cases and dog collars. Nimschke was trained in both the European style of engraving which was represented by fine delicate lines and the bolder American style characterized by his scrollwork.

== Engraving ==
Unlike most engravers of the 19th century who worked directly for firearms manufacturers, Nimschke maintained his own shop in New York City and took work on a contractual basis. His main client was New York outfitter Schuyler, Hartley and Graham. When a special custom order that required utmost detail needed to be filled the firearms companies would commission Nimschke for the work.

Ninschke engraved firearms for Theodore Roosevelt, George Armstrong Custer, Maria Christina of Austria, Buffalo Bill, Ben Thompson, and Napoleon III, Emperor of France. Nimschke's work is on display at many museums throughout the world including the Metropolitan Museum of Art.

Many engravers emulated his style, which has become known today as "Nimschke School" or "New York Style" of engraving.
