= John Taffin =

American writer (1939–2025)

- Born: May 2, 1939
- Died: March 10, 2025 (aged 85)
- Occupations: Teacher, author, firearms enthusiast
- Known for: Revolvers
- Spouse: Dorothy Mae Taffin
- Website: www.sixguns.com

John August Taffin (May 2, 1939 – March 10, 2025) was an American author from Boise, Idaho who wrote several columns for gun magazines including Guns, Gun Digest, Sixgunner, Shoot!, and American Handgunner. A math teacher from 1964 to 1995, Taffin was regarded as an authority on single-action revolvers, handloading, handgun hunting, big-bore revolvers, and metallic silhouette shooting. Taffin authored five books and over 500 published articles. His monthly published gun columns included: Siluetas, Campfire Tales, The Sixgunner, and Taffin Tests.

Taffin was widely regarded as an authority on revolvers, magnum cartridge load development, firearms rights and handguns in general.

In 2008 Taffin was instrumental in opening the Elmer Keith Museum in Boise, Idaho. The museum is located inside the local Cabela's retail location.

== Writing ==
Taffin's influences on his writing style were Elmer Keith and Skeeter Skelton. His first article appeared in the November 1967 edition of GUNsport. He wrote several other articles for the magazine until it ceased publication in 1969. Taffin went on to write for JD Jones's newsletter for Handgun Hunters International called The Sixgunner and Elgin Gates's newsletter for International Handgun Metallic Silhouette Association (IHMSA) titled The Silhouette in 1979. Taffin's first article for Guns magazine appeared in the December 1983 issue and in May 1984 he became a staff writer for the publication. In 1985, he became a staff writer for their sister publication: American Handgunner. Taffin published detailed review and handloading data on 22TCM in Guns twice: in 2017 focused on powder loads; and 2023 focused more on different projectiles.

== Death ==
Taffin died on March 10, 2025, at the age of 85.

== Bibliography ==
- Taffin, John (1997). Big Bore Sixguns. Iola, Wisconsin: KPI. ISBN 978-0-87341-502-6.
- Taffin, John (1999). Action Shooting Cowboy Style. Iola, Wisconsin: Krause. ISBN 978-0-87341-792-1.
- Taffin, John (2002). Big Bore Handguns. Iola, Wisconsin: Krause. ISBN 978-0-87349-463-2.
- Taffin, John (2006). The Gun Digest Book of the. Iola, Wisconsin: Gun Digest. ISBN 978-0-89689-416-7.
- Taffin, John (2005). Single Action Sixguns. Iola, Wisconsin: Krause. ISBN 978-0-87349-953-8.
