= Colt Open Top Pocket Model Revolver =

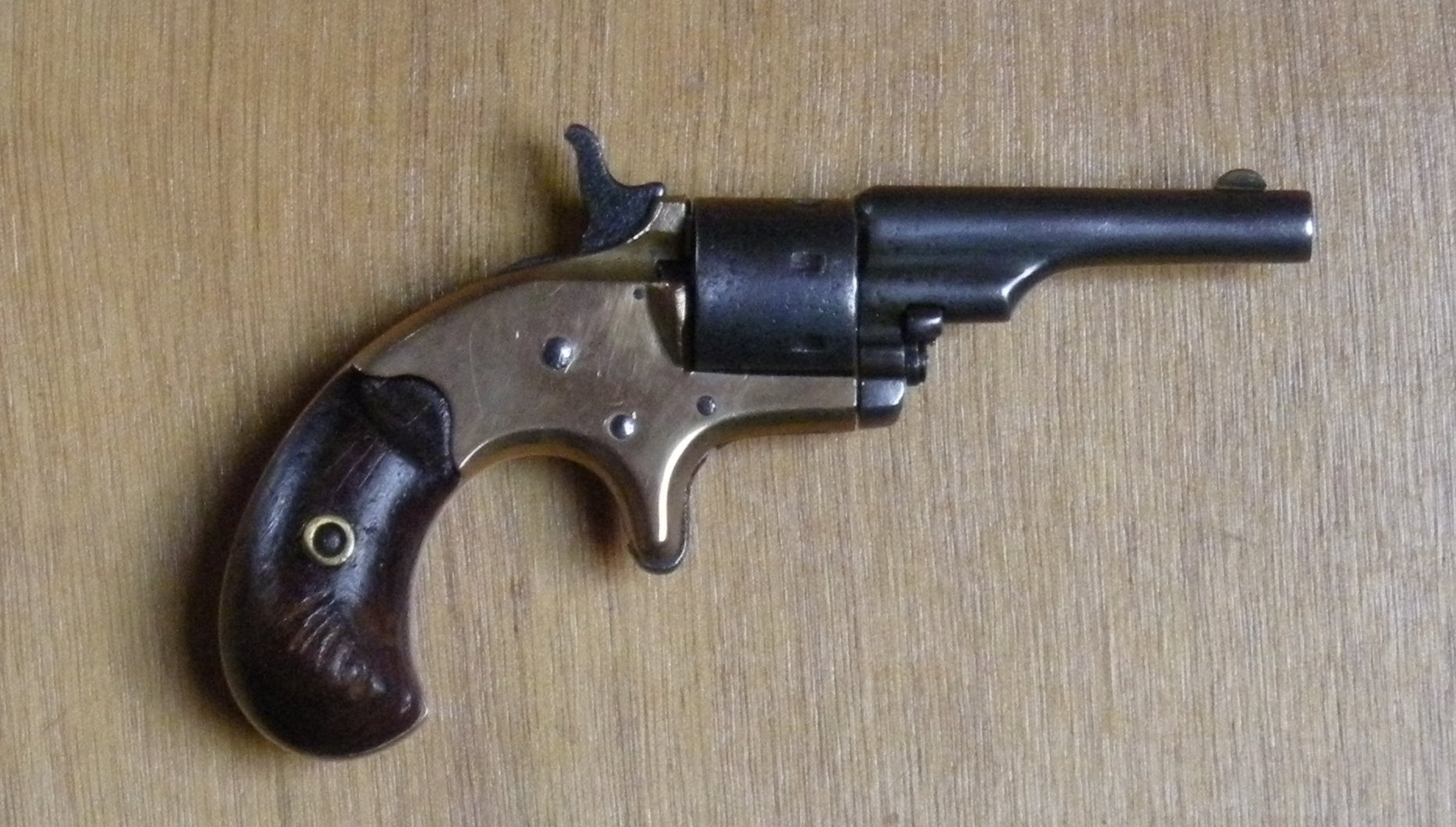
- Type: Revolver
- Place of origin: United States

Production history
- Designer: William Mason and Charles Brinckerhoff Richards
- Designed: 1871
- Manufacturer: Colt's Patent Firearms Manufacturing Company
- Produced: 1871–1877
- No. built: 114,200

Specifications
- Barrel length: 2 3/8 in (60 mm) and 2 7/8 in (73 mm)
- Cartridge: .22 Short, .22 Long
- Action: Single-action revolver
- Feed system: 7-shot Cylinder

The Colt Open Top Pocket Model Revolver was a single action pocket revolver introduced by the Colt's Patent Fire Arms Manufacturing Company in 1871. Introduced a year before the Colt Open Top (a model from 1872) and two years before the Colt Peacemaker and the Colt New Line (both introduced in 1873), the Colt Open Top Pocket Model Revolver was, alongside the Colt House Revolver, one of the two first metallic cartridge rear-loading revolvers manufactured by Colt's. It was also one of the first pocket metallic cartridge revolvers made by the company.

== History and design ==
When the Rollin White patent for bored-through cylinders in firearms manufacture expired (c. 1870) the Colt's Patent Fire Arms Manufacturing Company started working on its own metallic cartridge revolvers (Colt had previously been manufacturing the so-called Richards-Mason conversions). Thus, Colt introduced its first rear-loaders in 1871: the Colt House/Cloverleaf and the Colt Open Top Pocket Model Revolver.

In the 1870s the firearms market was awash with cheaply made knockoffs of the .22 caliber Smith & Wesson Model One which sold for about $2. Colt's president Richard Jarvis decided it would not compete directly with the knockoffs; that its .22 would be of Colt quality. The Open Top Pocket was priced at $8.

The frame was brass and sometimes silver or nickel plated. The barrel and cylinder were either blue or nickel plated. Rosewood or walnut grips on a bird's head style frame made for a comfortable pistol to shoot.

Loading was accomplished via a groove in the frame rearward of the cylinder and early models incorporated an ejector rod until 1874. After that, a shooter would need to remove the cylinder to empty the brass casings.

Cheap copies imported from Spain and Belgium drove down the demand for these revolvers and Colt stopped manufacturing them by 1877.

== Calibers ==
The Open Top Pocket Model was chambered in .22 Short and .22 Long, both using black powder as the propellant. It was equipped with a 7-shot non-fluted cylinder and two different barrel lengths: 2 3/8 in (60 mm) and 2 7/8 in (73 mm). NOTE: It is highly questionable that modern .22 ammunition would be safe to use in antique firearms.

== See also ==
- Colt New Line
- Colt Model 1855 Sidehammer Pocket Revolver
- Colt Pocket Percussion Revolvers
