= Colt's New Model revolving rifle =

Colt Model 1855 revolving carbine
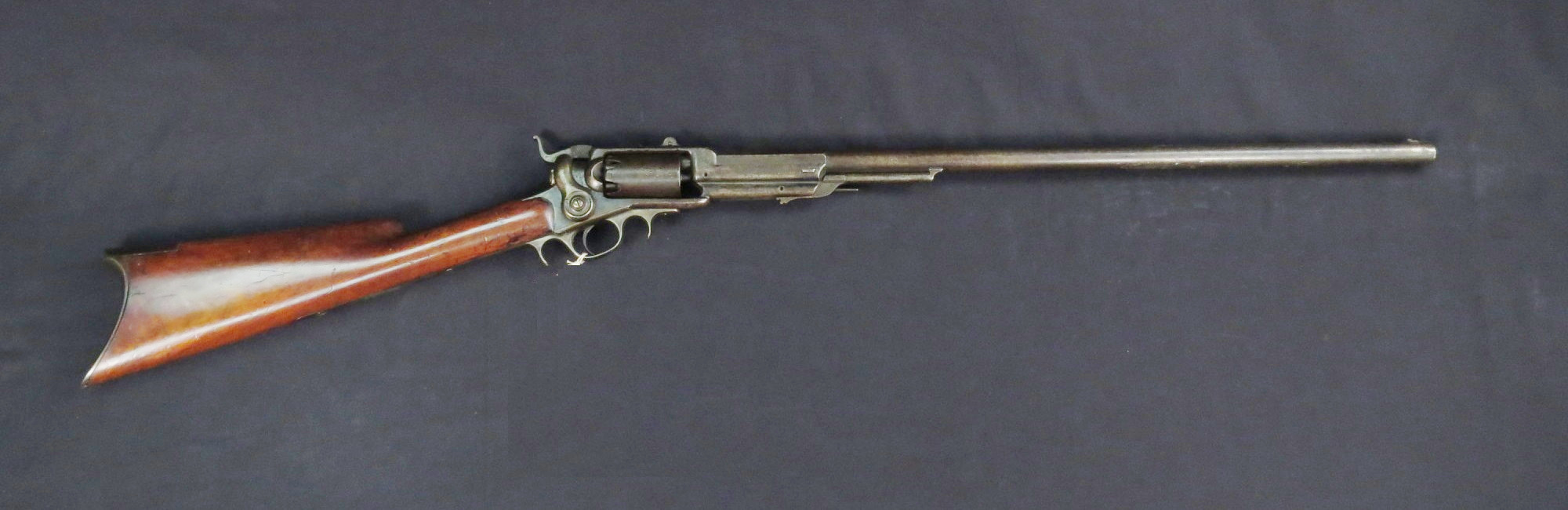
- M1855 Colt rifle
- Type: Rifle
- Place of origin: United States

Service history
- In service: 1855–1876
- Used by: United States; Confederate States; Native Americans; Canada; Australia; New Zealand; United Kingdom; British Empire; Russian Empire
- Wars: Utah War; American Civil War; January Uprising; American Indian Wars; Indian Rebellion of 1857; Australian frontier wars New Zealand wars Fenian Raid; Fenian Rising; Red River Rebellion; Boshin War

Production history
- Designed: 1855
- Produced: 1855 – 1864

Specifications
- Barrel length: 15-inches, 18-inches, 21-inches and 24-inches
- Cartridge: Cap and ball
- Caliber: .36, .44, or .56
- Action: Revolving
- Feed system: 6-shot (.36/.44) or 5-shot (.56)

The Colt New Model revolving rifles were early repeating rifles produced by the Colt's Manufacturing Company from 1855 until 1864. The design was essentially similar to revolver-type handguns, with a rotating cylinder that held five or six rounds in a variety of calibers from .36 to .64 inches. They were mainly based upon the Colt Model 1855 Sidehammer Pocket Revolver developed by Elisha K. Root. Colt revolving pistols and rifles were attractive mainly because of their high rate of fire. They were used to a limited extent on the Pony Express and made a brief appearance in the American Civil War. However, the rifles were generally disliked by soldiers, and were ultimately discontinued due to serious design flaws.

== History ==
Revolving rifles were an attempt to increase the rate of fire of rifles by combining them with the revolving firing mechanism that had been developed earlier for revolving pistols. Colt began experimenting with revolving rifles in the early 19th century, making them in a variety of calibers and barrel lengths.

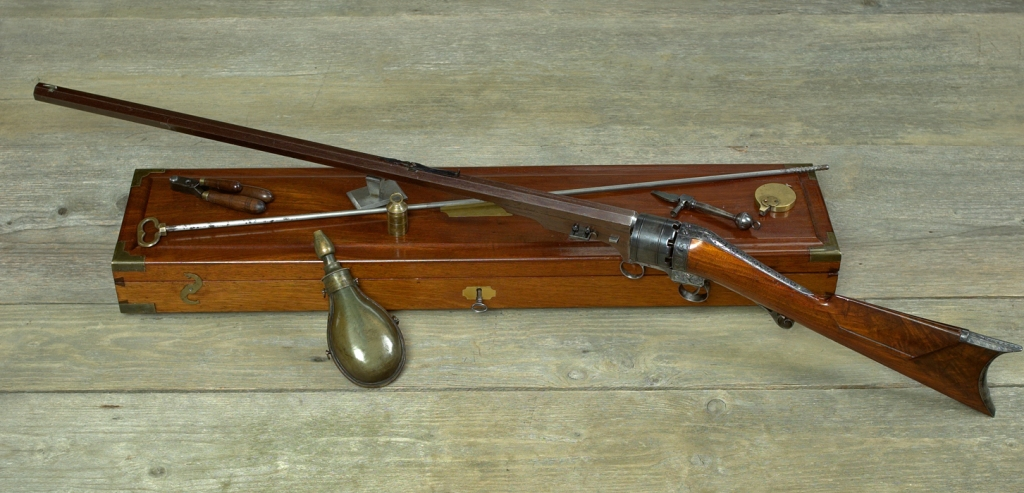
Colt Paterson 1838 ring-lever rifle

Colt revolving rifles were the first repeating rifles adopted by the U.S. government, but they had their problems. They were officially given to soldiers because of their rate of fire. But after firing six shots, the shooter had to take an excessive amount of time to reload. On occasion Colt rifles discharged all their rounds at once, endangering the shooter. Even so, an early model was used in the Seminole Wars in 1838.

In March 1836, Colt formed the Patent Arms Company and began operation in an unused silk mill along the banks of the Passaic River in Paterson, New Jersey. His first product was a ring-lever revolving rifle, available in .34, .36, .38, .40, and .44 caliber, in which a ring located forward of the trigger served to cock the hammer and advance the cylinder for each shot. This was soon followed with a revolving pistol. These five-shot "Paterson" revolvers featured folding triggers and were available both with and without loading levers in .28, .31 and .36 caliber.

Patent Arms produced smoothbore revolving carbines and shotguns. The outbreak of war between the U.S. government and the Seminole tribe provided Colt with his first break. Seminole warriors had learned that soldiers were vulnerable while reloading their single-shot firearms, and they developed a tactic of drawing fire, then rushing the temporarily defenseless soldiers and wiping them out before they could fire a second volley. Colt's revolving rifles were quite effective against this, and the army purchased his products for use by troops in the Florida campaign.

In 1855, with his Model 1855 patent, Colt introduced a spur-trigger revolver that featured a fully enclosed cylinder. These handguns were officially named Sidehammer revolvers, but they also were known as "Root" revolvers after Elisha K. Root, who at that time was employed as Colt's factory superintendent and Chief Engineer.

Cavalry officer Captain John G. Walker of the U.S. Mounted Rifles used M1855 Colt on the Texas frontier as an alternative to the Springfield Model 1842.

Prior to 1861, the U.S. government acquired approximately 765 Model 1855 rifles, a significant portion of which were distributed to Southern arsenals. Following the seizure of these facilities by the Confederacy, these armaments were integrated into their inventory; for instance, 73 Colt revolving rifles and carbines, along with roughly 60 long-barreled artillery models, were captured at the Baton Rouge Arsenal.

Based on the Sidehammer design, Colt produced the Sidehammer Model 1855 rifles and carbines for military and sporting use, as well as a revolving shotgun. In failing health, Colt expanded his factory on the eve of the Civil War, and began production of a new, lightweight .44 caliber Army revolver, followed a year later by a .36 caliber Navy version.

This was produced in a rifle version as well as a shortened carbine. In 1855 it became the first repeating rifle to be adopted for service by the U.S. Military, but problems with the design prevented its use until 1857. The principal problem was that gunpowder would sometimes leak from the paper cartridges in field conditions, lodging in various recesses around the firing cylinder. Hot gas leaking from the gap between the firing cylinder and the barrel would ignite this powder, which would in turn, ignite all of the powder in the chambers waiting to be fired. This is known as a "chain fire" and was a relatively common failure with early percussion revolving firearms. When this happened with the Colt Revolving Rifle, a spray of metal would be sent forward into the left arm and hand of the user.

A distrust in the weapon developed as a result. Commanders attempted to get around the problem in a number of ways. The rifle had to be properly and thoroughly cleaned, since sloppy cleaning would leave residue behind that would increase the risk of a chain fire. Some commanders instructed their men to fire the weapon only while supporting it directly in front of the trigger guard or by holding the lowered loading lever, which moved their left hand out of the path of danger during a chain fire. Other commanders instructed their men to load only a single chamber, preventing any chain fires from occurring. Loading a single chamber at a time also reduced the weapon to a single shot weapon, and effectively defeated the entire purpose of having a repeating rifle.

Brevete Colt Dragoon revolving rifles were made in Belgium under license from Colt during the 1850s to 1860s.

== Design and features ==
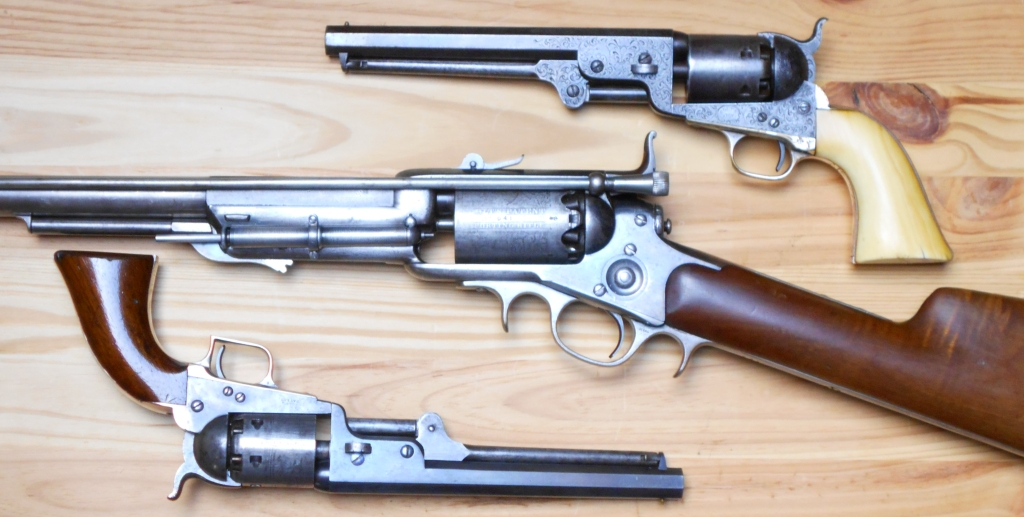
Two Colt Model 1851 Navy revolvers with same caliber and a Colt Root Model 1855 rifle, .36 cal.

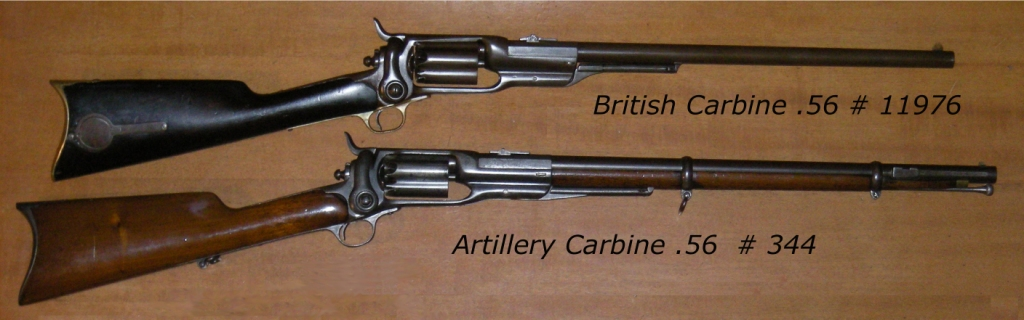
Colt Root carbines, .56 cal.

The design of the Colt revolving rifle was essentially similar to revolver-type pistols, with a rotating cylinder that held five or six rounds in a variety of calibers from .36 to .64 inches.

The Model 1855, which was the most widely produced revolving rifle, was available in .36, .44 and .56 caliber. Four barrel lengths were available: 15, 18, 21 and 24 inches. A six shot cylinder was used if the caliber was .36 or .44. If the caliber was .56, a five-shot cylinder was used.

A revolving rifle used percussion caps, like revolving pistols of the time. A cartridge (consisting of powder and a lead ball) was loaded into the front of the chamber and then compressed with a plunger that was located beneath the barrel. Once the cylinder's chambers were loaded, percussion caps were placed over the vent nipples at the rear of the cylinder. The weapon was now ready to fire. In addition to being susceptible to chain fire problems, the revolving cylinder design also tended to spray lead splinters into the wrist and hand of the user. Revolving pistols did not suffer from this problem since the user kept both hands behind the cylinder while firing a pistol.

Some models could be fitted with sword or socket bayonets. The front sight would double as the bayonet lug for use with a socket bayonet, and those adapted for sword bayonets had lugs on the right side.

== Use ==
A combination of Colt revolving pistols and revolving rifles were used on the Pony Express by the eight men who guarded the dangerous run between Independence, Missouri, and Santa Fe. When doubts were expressed about the ability of these eight men to deliver the letters on this run reliably, the in Missouri government declared that "these eight men are ready in case of attack to discharge 136 shots without having to reload. We have no fears for the safety of the mail." All mail deliveries on this route were completed safely.

During or in the aftermath of the Crimean War, a number of Colt rifles were purchased by Tsarist Russia and the Ottoman Empire.

During the fall of 1857, Colonel Randolph B. Marcy secured Colt revolving rifles for distribution to troops deploying to the Utah Territory. The U.S. government acquired Colt rifles that year, primarily for the Utah Expedition under the command of Colonel Albert Sidney Johnston, who led the newly established 2nd U.S. Cavalry. Although the majority of the 2nd Cavalry utilized Sharps or Hall carbines, a contingent of troopers was issued .44-caliber Colt revolving rifles prior to the expedition’s deployment. Among the 2nd Cavalry recruit are Robert E. Lee, William J. Hardee, Earl Van Dorn, Edmund Kirby Smith, Fitzhugh Lee, and John Bell Hood, all of whom subsequently served as generals in the Confederate Army. Additionally, the unit included future Union generals George H. Thomas, George Stoneman, and Kenner Garrard.

The U.S. government had purchased 765 Colt revolving carbines and rifles prior to the Civil War. Many of these were shipped to southern locations and ended up being used by the Confederacy. After the war began, the Union purchased many more rifles and carbines. Sources disagree over the exact number purchased, but approximately 4,400 to 4,800 were purchased in total over the length of the war. These weapons were subsequently utilized by various Confederate units, including the 1st, 7th, and 12th Virginia Cavalry, the 3rd Texas and 13th Tennessee Cavalry, as well as the 8th Virginia and 11th Mississippi Infantry regiments.

The weapon performed superbly in combat, seeing action with the 21st Ohio Volunteer Infantry Union forces at The Slaughter Pen while covering the withdrawal of John Miller's brigade during the Battle of Stones River and Snodgrass Hill during the Battle of Chickamauga during the American Civil War. The volume of fire from this weapon proved to be so useful that the Confederate forces were convinced that they were attacking an entire division, not just a single regiment, but still, the Ohioans ran out of ammunition, and surrendered. Despite these victories, the rifle's faults would prove fatal for the weapon. A board of officers evaluated the evidence and decided to discontinue its use. The rifles were sold for 42 cents each, a fraction of the original purchase cost of 44 dollars.

Many revolving rifles were purchased for the use of the militia of various states, and many militia companies entered the Civil War armed with them and never really used them in combat situations. The Colt Company made a number of sizes in the attempt to adapt the rifles to the various branches of the service. When used in the Civil War the soldiers in all branches of the service disliked them exceedingly on account of the flash and loud report so close to the face and dangerously strong recoil when several chambers went off at once.

== See also ==
- Colt Buntline
- Colt Model 1855 Sidehammer Pocket Revolver
- Spencer repeating rifle
- Henry rifle
- Rifles in the American Civil War
- Taurus Circuit Judge
- MTs-255
