= New Line (disambiguation) =

New Line Cinema is one of the ten major Hollywood movie studios.

New Line may also refer to:

- New Line Theatre, an alternative musical theatre company in St. Louis, Missouri
- New Line Records, a record label; formerly known as New Line Records, currently WaterTower Music
- Newline, a character or sequence of characters signifying the end of a line of text
- Colt New Line, a line of 19th century revolvers

== Transportation ==
- New Line (shipping line) or Robert Kermits Red Star Line, 19th century transatlantic shipping line
- Watford DC line or New Line, a commuter railway line from London Euston to Watford Junction
- Fukutoshin Line or Yūrakuchō New Line, a Tokyo Metro subway line
