= Anne Warner =

Anne Warner may refer to:

- Anne Warner (Australian politician) (born 1945), Australian state politician
- Anne Warner (New Hampshire politician), American politician
- Anne Warner (rower) (born 1954), American rower
- Anne Warner (scientist) (1940–2012), British biologist
- Anne Warner (swimmer) (born 1945), American Olympic swimmer
- Carol-Ann Warner (born 1945), British Olympic figure skater
- Anne Warner (novelist) (1869–1913), American author
- Anne Warner (folklorist) (1905–1991), American folklorist and song collector
- Ann Warner (c. 1908–1990), American socialite and arts patron

== See also ==
- Anna Bartlett Warner (1827–1915), American writer of books, poems and hymns
