= Harriet Roosevelt Richards =

American illustrator

- Born: June 1867; Hartford, Connecticut, United States
- Died: 1932 (aged 64–65); Southwest Harbor, Maine, United States
- Occupation: Illustrator
- Parent: Charles Brinckerhoff Richards
- Relatives: Charles Cutler Torrey (brother-in-law)

Harriet Roosevelt Richards (June 1867 – 1932) was an American illustrator, best known for her work in children's books and magazines.

== Early life and education ==
Harriet Roosevelt Richards was born in Hartford, Connecticut, the daughter of Charles Brinckerhoff Richards and Agnes Edwards Goodwin Richards. Both of her parents were born in New York; her father was a mechanical engineer and a professor at Yale University. Her younger sister Marian married historian Charles Cutler Torrey, another Yale professor.

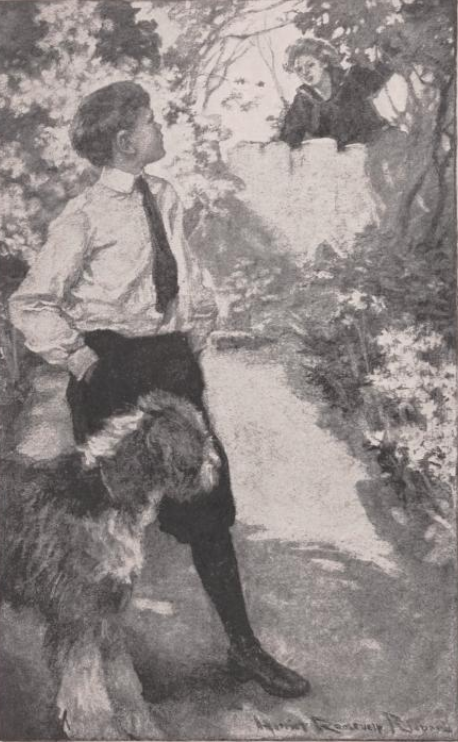
H. R. Richards, frontispiece from Buddie: The Story of a Boy (1911) by Anna Chapin Ray

Richards studied art with Frank Weston Benson in Boston and Howard Pyle in Wilmington, and at the Yale School of Fine Arts.

== Career ==
Richards lived in Wilmington, Delaware from 1905 to 1912. She was a member of the Plastic Club in Philadelphia, and exhibited with the New Haven Paint and Clay Club, and with the Washington Water Color Club.

Richards's illustrations appeared in children's magazines including Wide Awake, St. Nicholas, The Youth's Companion, and Harper's Young People. She illustrated books for young readers, written by authors including Elizabeth Weston Timlow, Anna Chapin Ray, Helen Hunt Jackson, and Louisa May Alcott.

== Books illustrated by Richards ==
- Susan Coolidge, Rhymes and Ballads for Girls and Boys (1892)
- Barbara Yechton, Two Knights Errant and Other Stories (1894), and A Matter of Honor and Other Stories (1894)
- Elizabeth Weston Timlow, the Cricket books
- Louisa May Alcott, Eight Cousins, Rose in Bloom, and Jack and Jill (1905 edition)
- Jane Pentzer Myers, Stories of Enchantment (1901)
- Alice Ward Bailey, Roberta and Her Brothers (1906)
- Anna Chapin Ray, the Sidney books and the Buddie books
- Helen Hunt Jackson, Nelly's silver mine (1910 edition)
- Della Campbell MacLeod, The Maiden Manifest (1913)
- Anne Warner, Sunshine Jane (1914)
- Kate Langley Bosher, How It Happened (1916)
- Jane Abbott, Keineth (1918), Highacres (1920) Aprilly (1921), and Red-Robin (1922)

== Personal life ==
Richards died at age 65, in Southwest Harbor, Maine, in 1932.
