= Colt New Line =

Single action pocket revolver

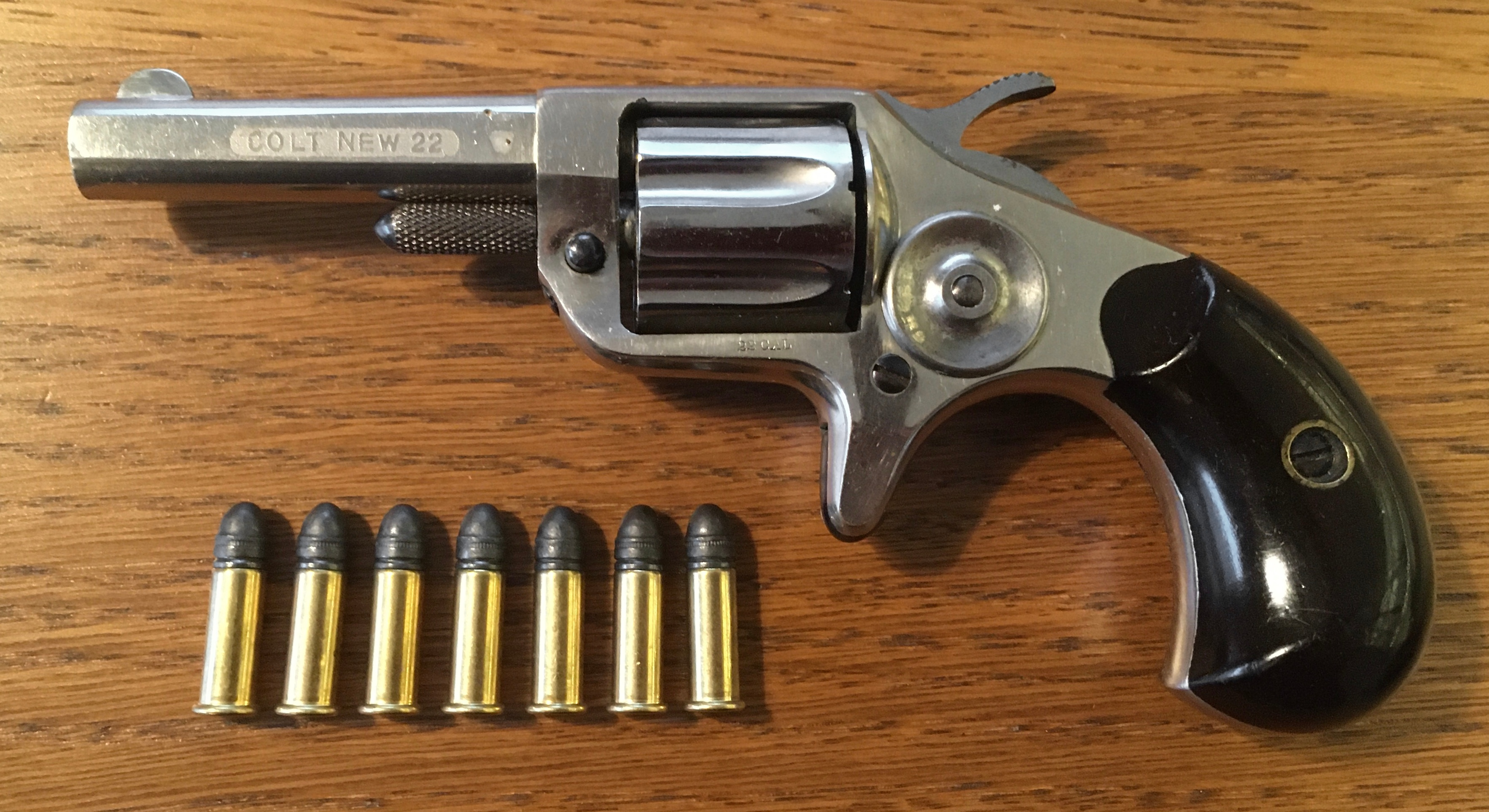
Colt New Line, .22 caliber, second revision with long cylinder flutes. Shown with 7. rounds of .22 long ammunition.

The Colt New Line was a single action pocket revolver introduced by the Colt's Patent Fire Arms Manufacturing Company in 1873.

Two years after the Colt House Revolver (1871), a year after the Colt Open Top (1872) and almost simultaneously alongside the Colt Single Action Army (1873), the Colt New Line was one of the first metallic cartridge rear-loading revolvers manufactured by Colt. It was, alongside the Colt Open Top Pocket Model Revolver (1871), one of the first pocket metallic cartridge revolvers made by the company.

== History ==
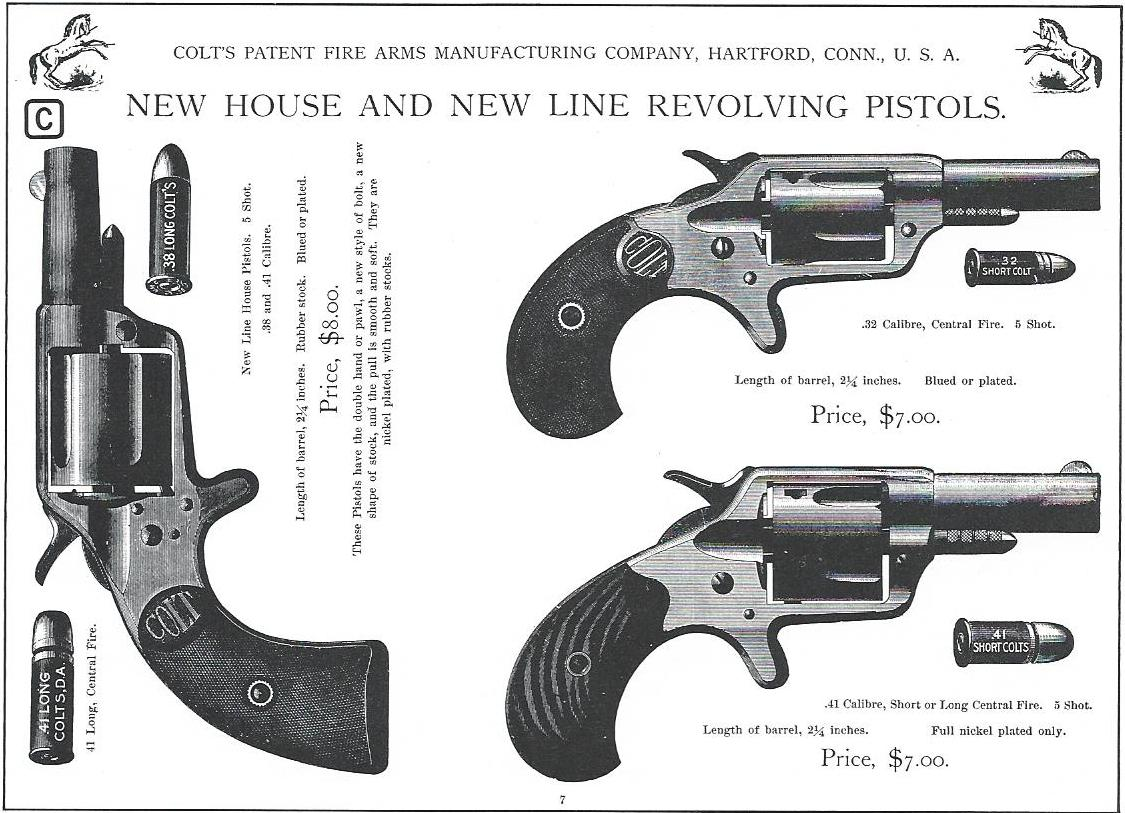
Period newspaper advertisement from the mid-1870s, for the Colt New Line revolvers.

When the Rollin White patent for metallic cartridges firearms manufacture expired (c. 1870) the Colt's Patent Fire Arms Manufacturing Company started working on its own metallic cartridge revolvers. Thus, after having introduced its first breech-loaders in 1871 (Colt House/Cloverleaf) and 1872 (Colt Open Top), in 1873 Colt launched the Colt Single Action Army along with a new line of pocket revolvers, sorted in five different calibers. Since it was an entirely new line of revolvers this model was called the Colt New Line.

Circa 1884–1886, submerged by the competitors' cheaper imitations and refusing to introduce a lower quality among its own firearms, the Colt company dropped the line and ceased production.

== Variants ==
The Colt New Line was chambered and produced as follows.

- Colt New Line .22 Caliber Revolver: in production from 1873 to 1877
- Colt New Line .30 Caliber Revolver: in production from 1874 to 1876
- Colt New Line .32 Caliber Revolver: in production from 1873 to 1884
- Colt New Line .38 Caliber Revolver: in production from 1874 to 1880
- Colt New Line .41 Caliber Revolver: in production from 1874 to 1879

The .22 caliber version was equipped with a 7-shot cylinder. All four other versions of the gun had 5-round cylinders.

== Specifications (.22 caliber version) ==
- Production period: 1873 - 1877
- Caliber: .22 short / .22 long
- Weight: 0.44 lbs (0.2 kg)
- Barrel length: 2.2 in (56mm)
- Capacity: 7-round cylinder
- Fire Modes: Single Action
- Loading Modes: Breach loading

== Specifications (.38 caliber version) ==
- Production period: 1874 - 1880
- Caliber: .38 Long Colt
- Weight: 0.84 lbs (0.38 kg)
- Barrel length: 2.25 in (57 mm), 4 in (10.2 cm)
- Capacity: 5-round cylinder
- Fire Modes: Single Action
- Loading Modes: Breech-loading

== See also ==
- .22 Short
- .22 Long
- .32 Long Colt
- .38 Long Colt
- .41 Short Colt
- .41 Long Colt
- Colt Model 1855 Sidehammer Pocket Revolver
- Colt Pocket Percussion Revolvers
