= Colt Model 1871–72 Open Top =

Revolver

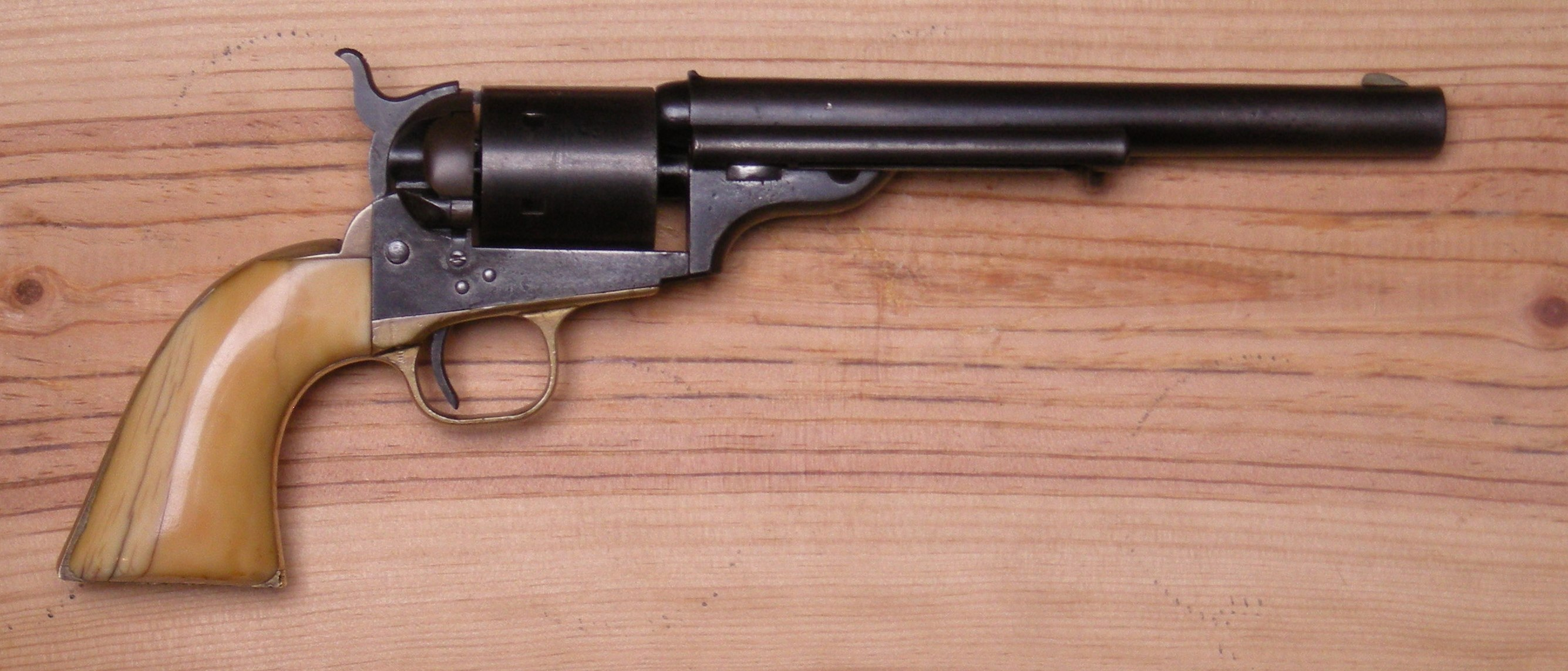
- Type: Revolver
- Place of origin: United States

Production history
- Designer: William Mason and Charles Brinckerhoff Richards
- Designed: 1870/71
- Manufacturer: Colt's Patent Firearms Manufacturing Company
- Produced: 1871–1873

Specifications
- Mass: 1,190 g
- Length: 330 mm
- Barrel length: 7½"
- Cartridge: .44 Henry Rimfire
- Action: Single-action revolver
- Feed system: 6-shot Cylinder

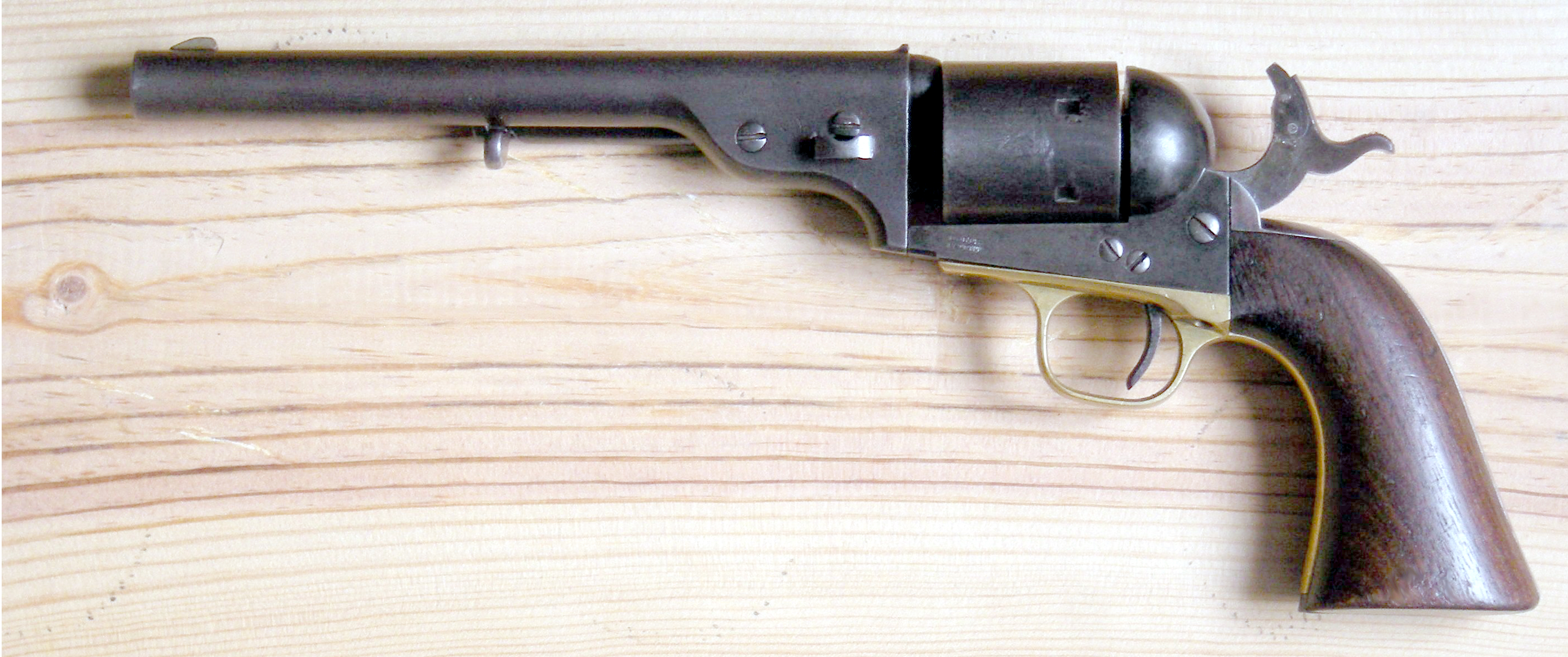
Colt Open Top, later model with larger Colt 1860 Army grip

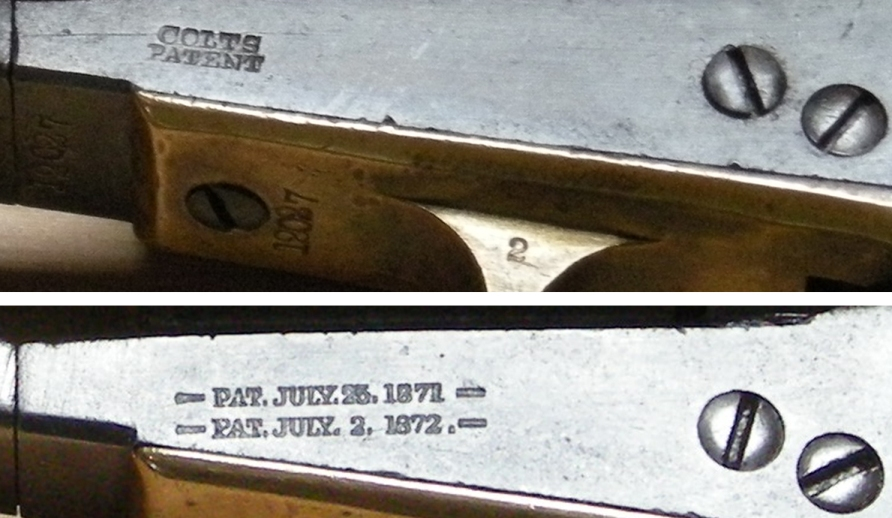
Colt's Patent inscriptions

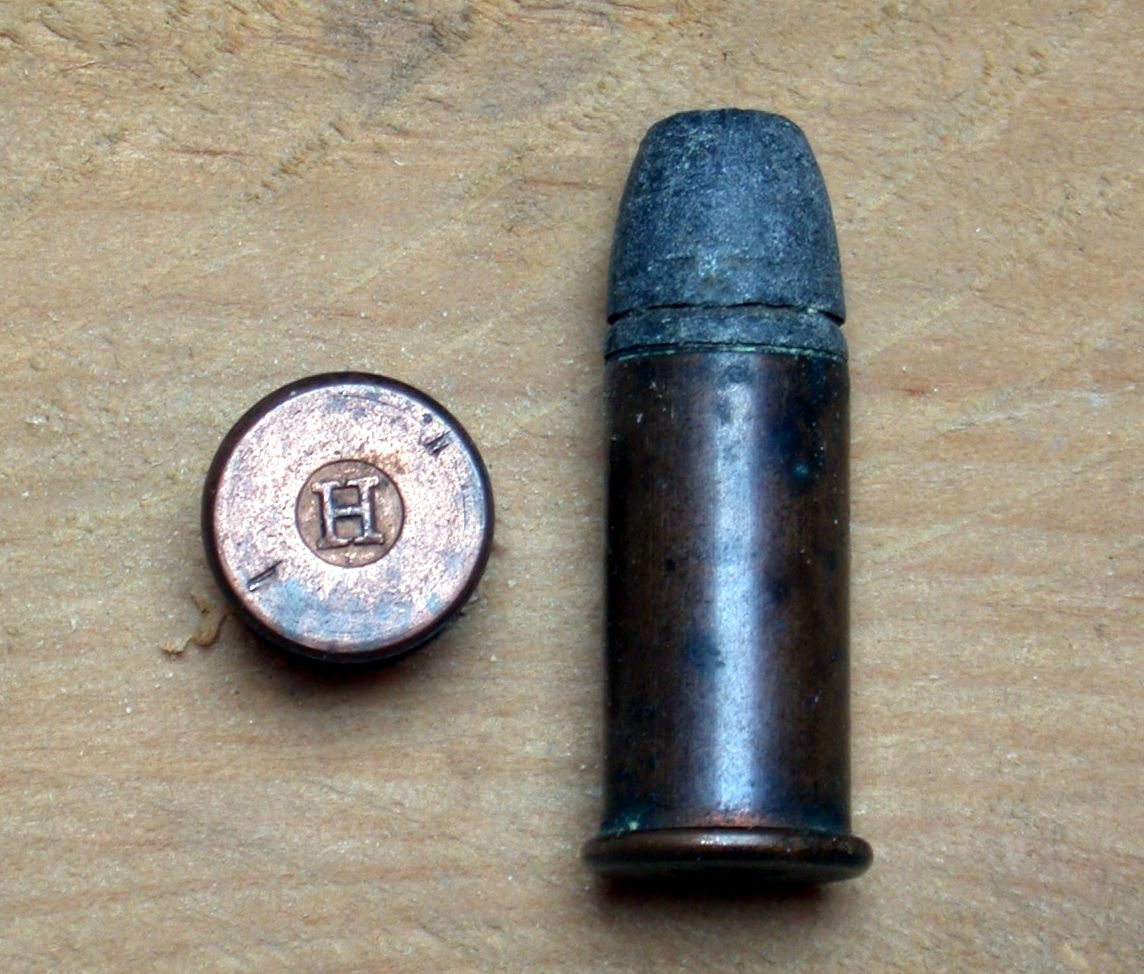
.44 Henry Flat Cartridge

The Colt Model 1871–72 Open Top is a metallic cartridge rear-loading .44-caliber revolver introduced in 1872 by the Colt's Patent Fire Arms Manufacturing Company. The handgun was developed following two patents, the first in 1871 and the second in 1872, and is estimated to have been produced primarily between February 1872 and June 1873. This has led to some confusion in its name. Both Colt Model 1871 and Colt Model 1872 have been used, but currently the most commonly accepted names are Colt Model 1871–72 Open Top, Colt Model 1871–72 or Colt Open Top.

== Development ==
When Rollin White's request of extension for his breech-loading revolvers patent was rejected by the American Government in January 1870 the Colt's Patent Fire Arms Manufacturing Company started working on its own metallic cartridge rear-loaders. Up until then, it had been only practicing the so-called Richards-Mason conversions. The Colt company continued converting muzzle-loading percussion revolvers into rear-loaders until 1878, but in 1871 Colt's had patented at least two rear-loading revolvers using metallic cartridges: the Colt House Revolver and the Open Top. The House revolver went into production the same year in 1871 but the Open Top didn't start production until 1872, although a pocket version of the Open Top, a completely different design, went on sale as of 1871, the Colt Open Top Pocket Model Revolver.

While the House and Cloverleaf revolvers were chambered in the .41 caliber, relatively well known at the time, William Mason, the engineer working on the design of the Open Top, chose the more powerful .44 Henry cartridge. The trigger and revolving mechanism were based on the same design as previous Colt revolvers, the well-improved cap and ball percussion guns that made the Colt's company prestige status. Mason brought some innovations to his gun: apart from the breech-loading cylinder, he designed unique frame, cylinder and barrel for the first Colt revolver with parts that were non-interchangeable with the older percussion pistols, and moved the rear sight to the rear of the barrel as opposed to the hammer or the breechblock of the earlier efforts. Chambered in .44 caliber, the gun was submitted to the US Army for testing in 1872. The Army rejected the pistol and asked for a more powerful caliber with a stronger frame. Mason redesigned the frame to incorporate a topstrap, similar to the Remington revolvers, and placed the rear sight on the rear of the frame; he consulted with Richards on some other improvements. The first prototype of the new gun was still chambered in .44 rimfire, but this new gun was chambered for the newest caliber known as the .45 Colt. This new design started production in 1873, giving birth to a new model, the Colt Single Action Army, and a new serial numbering.

The frames of early Open Top revolvers were marked COLT'S/PATENT, later models sported the so-called "Two July" patent marking, also found on the 1851 Navy-, 1861 Navy- and 1860 Army-conversion revolvers. The "Two July" patents were also found on very early Colt Single Action Army revolvers.

== Specifications ==
- Production period: 1872-1873
- Total production: Circa 7,000
- Barrel length: 7,5"
- Capacity: 6-round cylinder
- Fire Modes: Single Action
- Loading Modes: Breech-loading

== Legacy ==
In 1871 and 1872, the nonstop improvement of the Colt Open Top lead to the creation of the better-known Colt Single Action Army revolver.

Cimarron Firearms of Fredericksburg, Texas, imports a replica of the Open-Top revolver that is based on an antique Open Top that the company sent to Uberti to reverse-engineer. The replica revolver differs in one aspect, a safety has been placed on the hammer.

== See also ==
- Colt House Revolver
- Colt Single Action Army
