= Colt Lightning =

Colt Lightning may refer to:

- Colt Lightning Carbine
- Colt Lightning Revolver
