= Colt House Revolver =

- Type: Revolver
- Place of origin: United States

Production history
- Designed: 1870/71
- Manufacturer: Colt's Patent Firearms Manufacturing Company
- Produced: 1871–1876

Specifications
- Cartridge: .41 Rimfire
- Action: Single-action revolver
- Feed system: 4-5-shot Cylinder

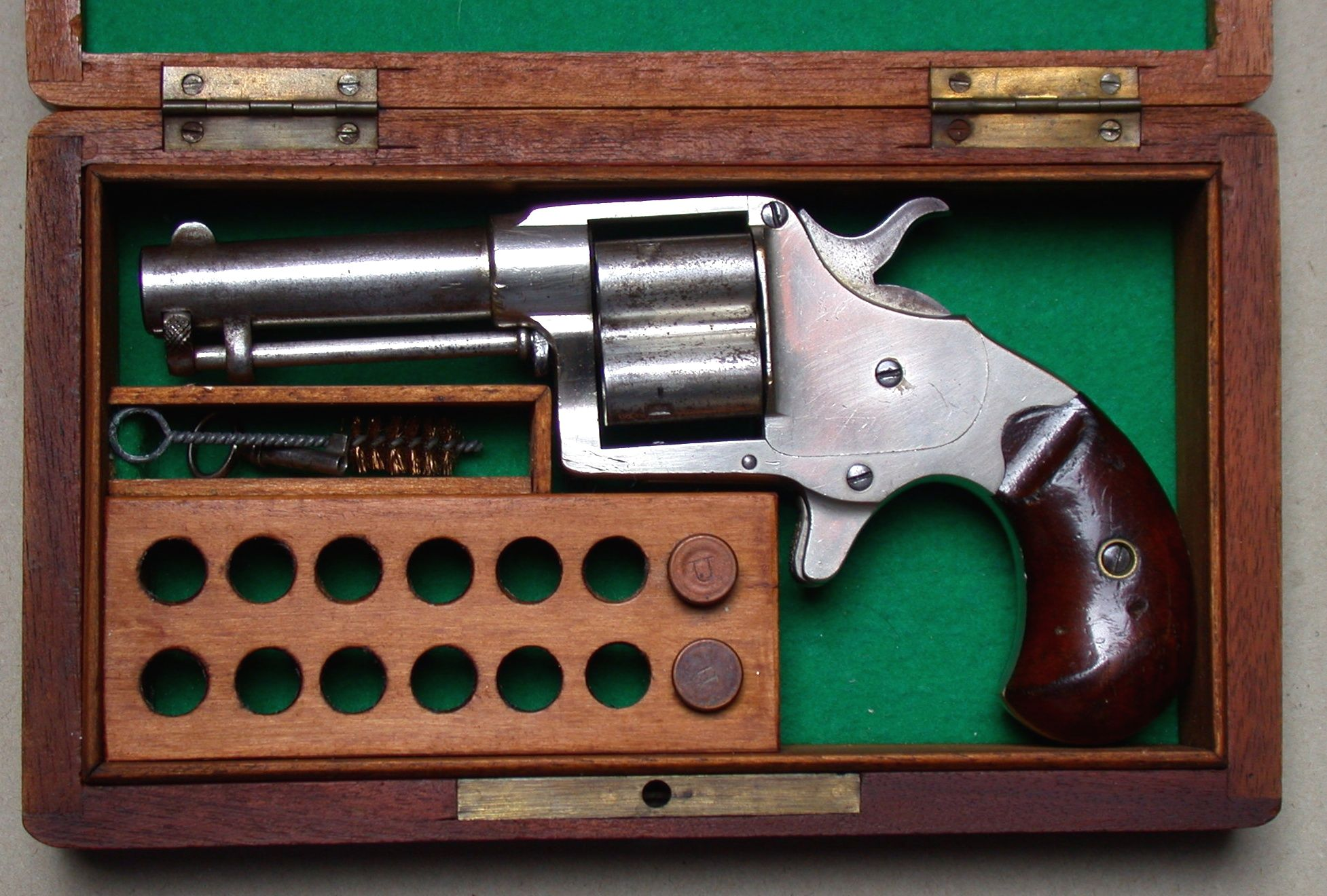
A view of a Cloverleaf Model Revolver

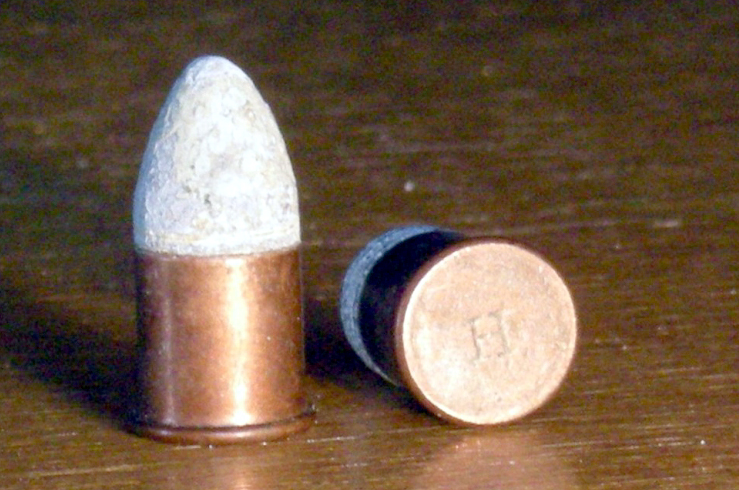
.41 rimfire

The Colt House Revolver (also called, in its alternate 4-round capacity model, the Cloverleaf) was one of the first metallic cartridge rear-loading revolvers to be produced by the Colt's Patent Fire Arms Manufacturing Company, in 1871. The same year, Colt's also patented the Colt Open Top, another metallic cartridge rear-loader, but in fact the Open Top production did not start until 1872, although a pocket version of the Open Top, a completely different design, went on sales as of 1871, the Colt Open Top Pocket Model Revolver.

The Colt House Revolver was manufactured from 1871 to 1876 in two different models: the Colt House Model itself and the Colt Cloverleaf Model, the latter being the most produced of both. The House Model is also known among collectors as the Jim Fisk model or the Jim Fisk pistol, since it attained the infamy of being the gun used in the murder of James Fisk in January 1872.

== Anatomy and specifications ==
Both models, House and Cloverleaf, were built around a solid hidden spur-trigger frame, a weapon architecture also used by another Colt gun, the Colt Sidehammer (1855). The Sidehammer had a flat-ended grip, while the House and Cloverleaf models had all of them a recognizable "bird's-head" grip. These features (spur trigger, "birds-head" grips, etc.) were common on many small pistols and revolvers during that era, such as the classic two-shot "derringer" pistol.

Finally, both models, House and Cloverleaf, were chambered with .41 caliber rimfire cartridges, available in both long and short sizes. The main differences between the two models were the following:

=== Cylinder ===
- The House Model, also called the Jim Fisk Model, had a five rounds straight non-fluted cylinder.
- The Cloverleaf Model had a four rounds fluted cylinder. When viewed from front or rear the cylinder seemed to resemble a four-leaf clover, hence the moniker.

=== Barrel ===
- The House Model was less produced of the two and had no variant development. It was produced in a single item product with a 2-5/8" barrel.
- The Cloverleaf Model was more produced by far, and had two different variants, depending on the barrel length: 1-1/2" and 3". The 1-1/2" barrel length variant had an ejector rod contained within the center pin of the cylinder, allowing to reload while keeping the cylinder in the gun. The 3" barrel length variant of the Cloverleaf had the ejector in the same axis of the cylinder center pin and, thus, the cylinder needed to be removed from the frame when loading.

== Influences in later Colt firearms ==
The Colt New Line (1873) inherited the general shape of the Colt House: a bird's head grip and a solid spur-trigger frame.

== See also ==
- Colt Model 1855 Sidehammer Pocket Revolver
