= Colt M1878 =

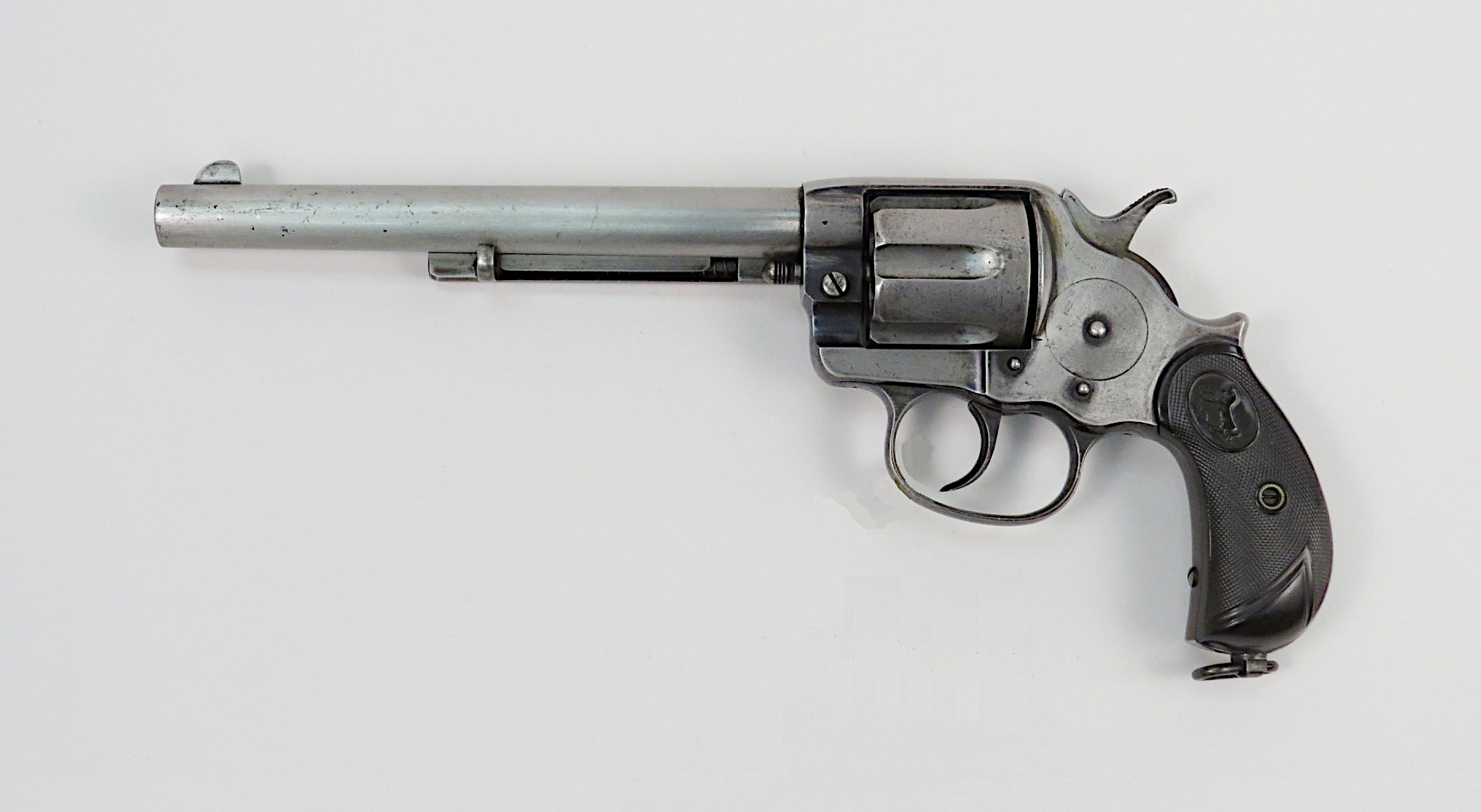
- Colt M1878
- Type: Revolver
- Place of origin: United States

Service history
- Wars: North-West Rebellion, American Indian Wars, Spanish-American War

Production history
- Designer: William Mason
- Designed: 1878
- Produced: 1878–1907

Specifications
- Caliber: .32-20 WCF, .38 Long Colt, .38-40 WCF, .41 Long Colt, .44-40 WCF, .455 Webley, .45 Colt, .476 Eley
- Action: Double-action revolver
- Feed system: 6-shot cylinder

The Colt M1878 is a double-action revolver that was manufactured by Colt's Manufacturing Company from 1878 until 1907. It is often referred to as the "Frontier" or the "Double Action Army" revolver, and was manufactured to shoot a variety of rimmed, centerfire, and black powder cartridges, in calibers detailed nearby. A total of 51,210 Model 1878 revolvers were manufactured, including 4,600 for the US Ordnance Department. These are known as the "Philippine" or "Alaskan" models. While 1878 with "PALL MALL LONDON" markings were specifically designed for the .455 Webley / .476 Eley and were intended for export.

== History ==
Samuel Colt experimented with double-action revolver systems, but he considered them to be unreliable. After Colt's patent expired in 1857, other manufacturers began producing double-action revolvers, but Colt's Manufacturing did not manufacture its own double-action revolver until 1877, twenty years after the patent had expired.

The M1878 was designed by William Mason, Colt's factory manager and Charles Brinckerhoff Richards, Superintendent of Engineering. It was similar in design to the Colt Model 1877. The Model 1878 had a larger frame, and is therefore sometimes referred to as the "large frame" double-action revolver, while the Model 1877 is likewise referred to as the "small frame" double-action revolver. The Model 1878 was considered a more robust and reliable design than the Model 1877.

== Design and features ==
The design of the Model 1878 was based on the Model 1877, which in turn was based heavily on the design of the earlier Colt Single Action Army revolver. A strut is added to connect the trigger movement to the hammer. The top of the trigger slips beyond the strut so that the hammer will stay in full cock if it is pulled back manually.

The Model 1878 had a larger frame than the Model 1877, which allowed it to fire larger and more powerful cartridges such as the .45 Colt and .44-40 Winchester, and used the same barrel & ejector parts as the Single Action Army revolver and a very similar cylinder. At one time, the factory modified Model 1878 cylinders for use in single-action revolvers in an attempt to use up spare parts.

== Variants ==
The Model 1878 was available in .32-20, .38 Colt, .38-40, .41 Colt, .44-40, .45 Colt, .45 Boxer, .455 Webley, and .476 Eley. The most popular calibers were the .44-40 Winchester and .45 Colt.

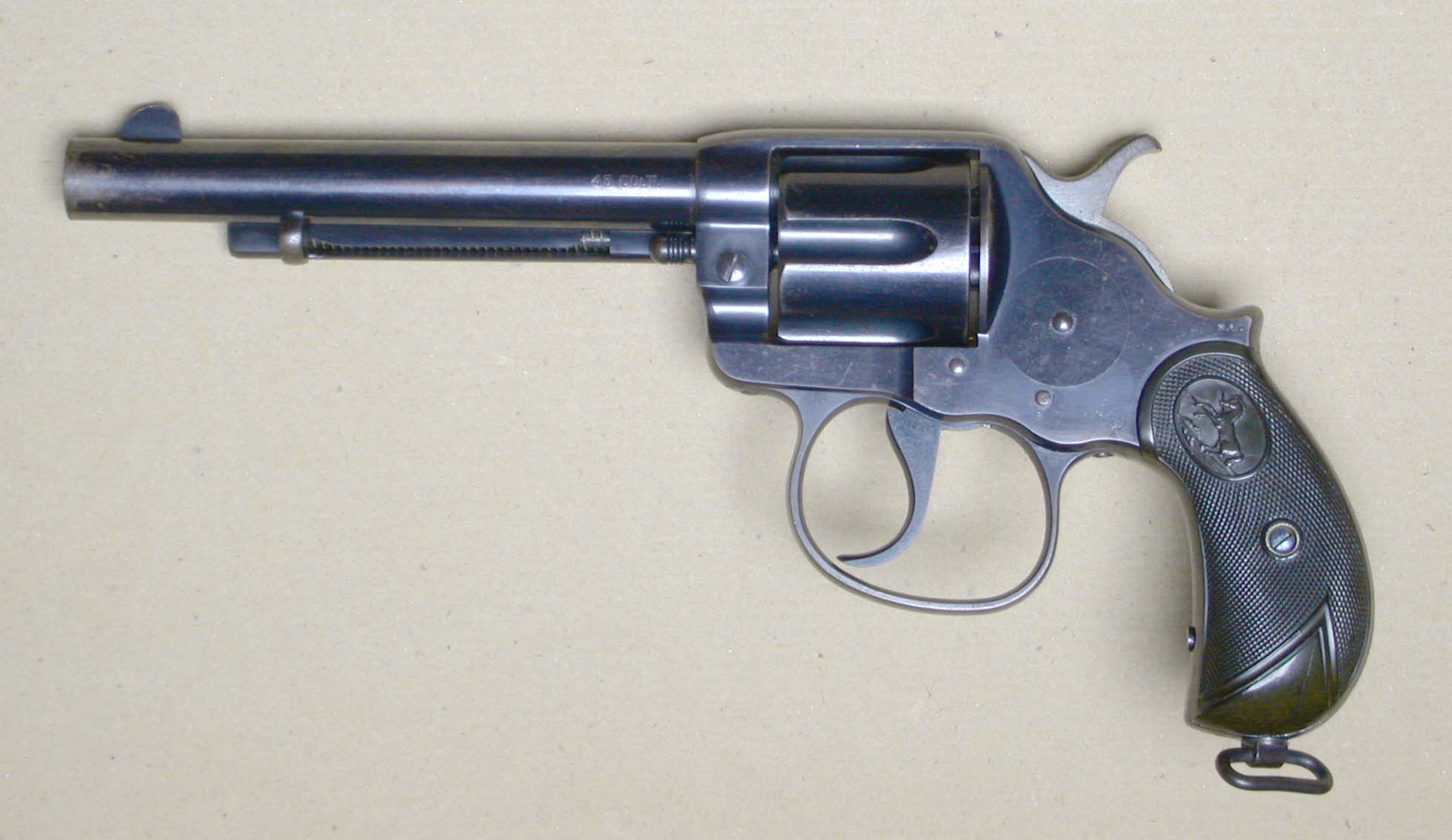
Colt Model 1902 "Philippine"

Standard grips were black checkered hard rubber but some early revolvers were produced with checkered walnut grips. Barrel lengths were available from 2 1/2 to 7 1/2 inches. Revolvers with 4-inch and shorter barrels did not have an ejector.

In 1902, 4,600 Model 1878 revolvers were produced for a U.S. Army contract. They were intended to equip the Philippine Constabulary under Brigadier General Henry T. Allen during the Philippine–American War (1899–1902). These revolvers had 6-inch barrels, hard rubber grips, and were chambered for the .45 Colt cartridge. They also had strengthened mainsprings and lengthened the triggers to give the user more leverage, thus giving a more reliable and consistent trigger pull. This is the primary reason for the enlarged trigger guards. The strengthened mainspring was necessary to fire the .45 Colt Government rounds which had a less sensitive primer compared to the civilian .45 Colt ammunition. Many people have incorrectly assumed that this was to allow the revolver to be operated while wearing gloves in cold weather. That means that the "Alaskan Model" is a misnomer.These revolvers are also unofficially designated the Colt 1902 Philippine Model (Colt M1902).
