= Della Campbell MacLeod =

American author and journalist

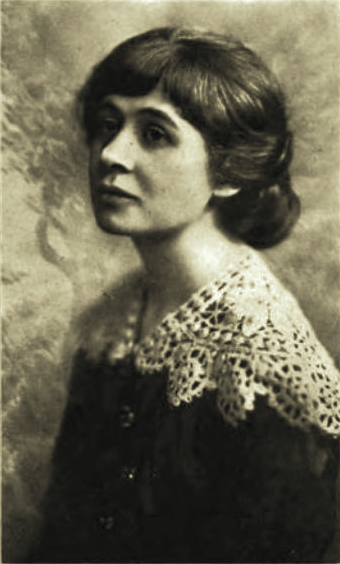
- Born: ca. 1884; French Bend Plantation, Greenwood, Mississippi, U.S.
- Died: 29 July 1921
- Occupations: author; journalist
- Writing career
- Pen name: "Rose MacRae"; "Campbell MacLeod"
- Period: 1908–22
- Genres: novels; short stories; non-fiction articles

Della Campbell MacLeod (c. 1884 – 1921) was an American author and journalist, who wrote novels, short stories, and non-fiction articles, using the pseudonyms "Rose MacRae" and "Campbell MacLeod", as well as writing under her own name. MacLeod published three novels: The Maiden Manifest (1913), A Lantern of Love: A Novel in Three Parts (1921), and The Swan and the Mule: A Novel (1922). She also wrote book reviews and other articles for various periodicals including New Orleans Picayune, Munsey's Magazine, Baltimore News, and New York Press.

== Biography ==
Della Campbell MacLeod was born on the French Bend Plantation, Greenwood, Mississippi, on the Yazoo River, ca. 1884. Her parents were Duncan and Nora (Hooker) MacLeod.

Her education progressed through interruptions, ending with a year at a fashionable finishing school.

Soon after finishing her education, MacLeod began her career writing book reviews for the New Orleans Picayune, and serving as Assistant Sunday editor (1905–06). After two years of training there, she came to New York and did freelance work for a year (1908–09). Another year in the Southern United States intervened before her return to New York, where she became a member of the Munsey's Magazine staff. Then she returned to the South again, and was a member of the Baltimore News (1910–13). Returning to New York, she became a special writer on the New York Press. She died there on 29 July 1921.

== Selected works ==
=== Novels ===
- The Maiden Manifest (with illustrations by Harriet Roosevelt Richards; Boston, Little, Brown, & Co., 1913) (text)
- A Lantern of Love: A Novel in Three Parts (1921) (text)
- The Swan and the Mule: A Novel (1922) (text)

=== Short stories ===
- "Omens of Good Luck and Bad" (1908)
- "Cupid at the Cleaners" (1909)
- "Life's Honey, a Little Study in Values" (1917)

=== Articles ===
- "Costa Rican Indians" (1908)
- "Clara Barton, Founder of the American Red Cross" (1912)
