= Colt M1877 =

Early double-action revolver

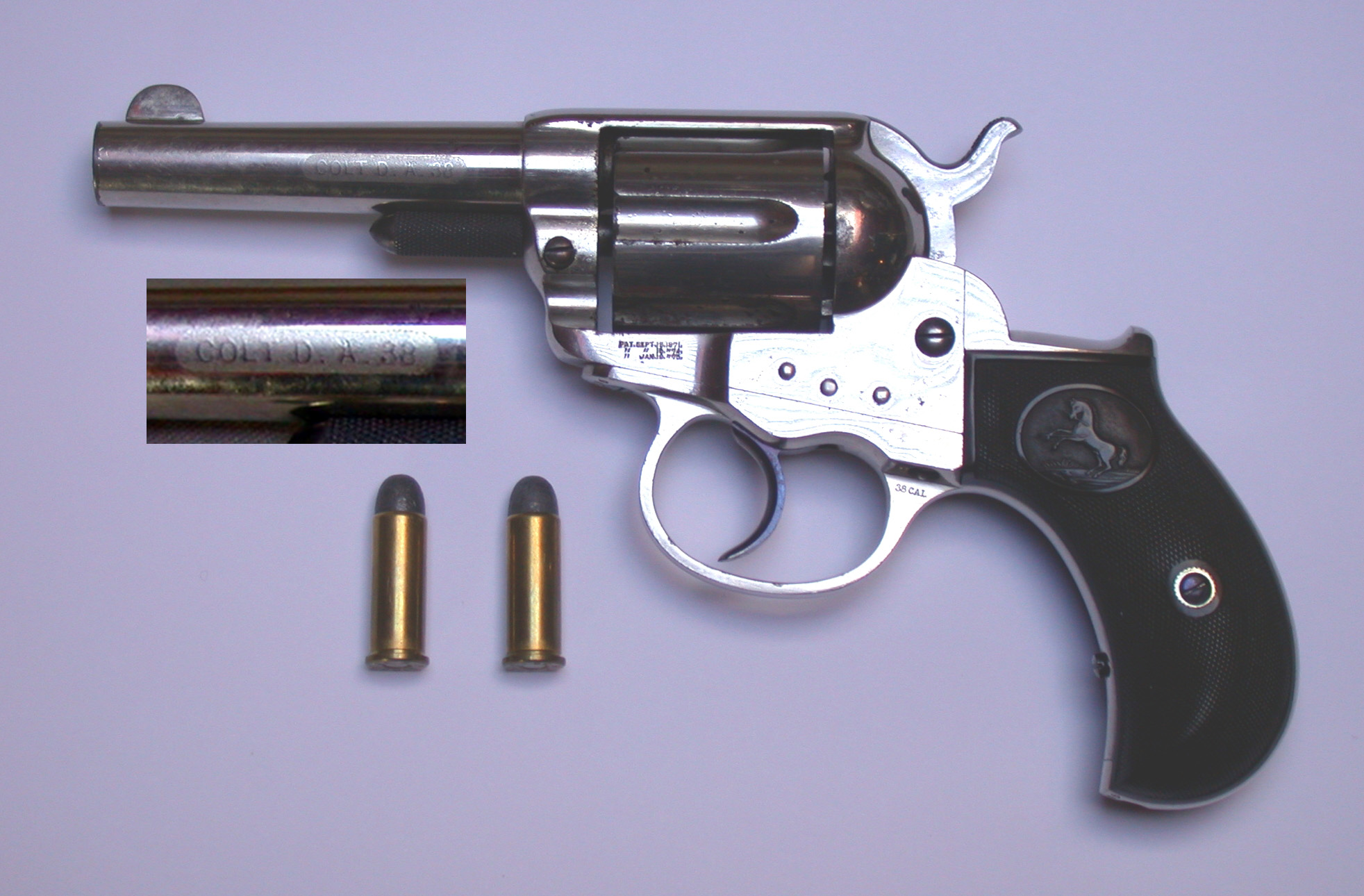
- Colt M1877 "Lightning"
- Type: Revolver
- Place of origin: United States

Service history
- Used by: Cowboys, Lawmen, American Old West bandits and outlaws, hunters,
- Wars: American Indian Wars, North-West Rebellion, Spanish-American War

Production history
- Designer: William Mason
- Designed: 1877
- Produced: 1877–1909
- No. built: 166,849

Specifications (for .41 caliber model)
- Mass: 24 ounces
- Length: 9.06 inches
- Barrel length: 4.41 inches
- Width: 1.34 inches
- Height: 4.80 inches
- Cartridge: .32 Long Colt ("Rainmaker").38 Long Colt ("Lightning").41 Long Colt ("Thunderer")
- Action: Double-action revolver
- Feed system: 6-shot cylinder

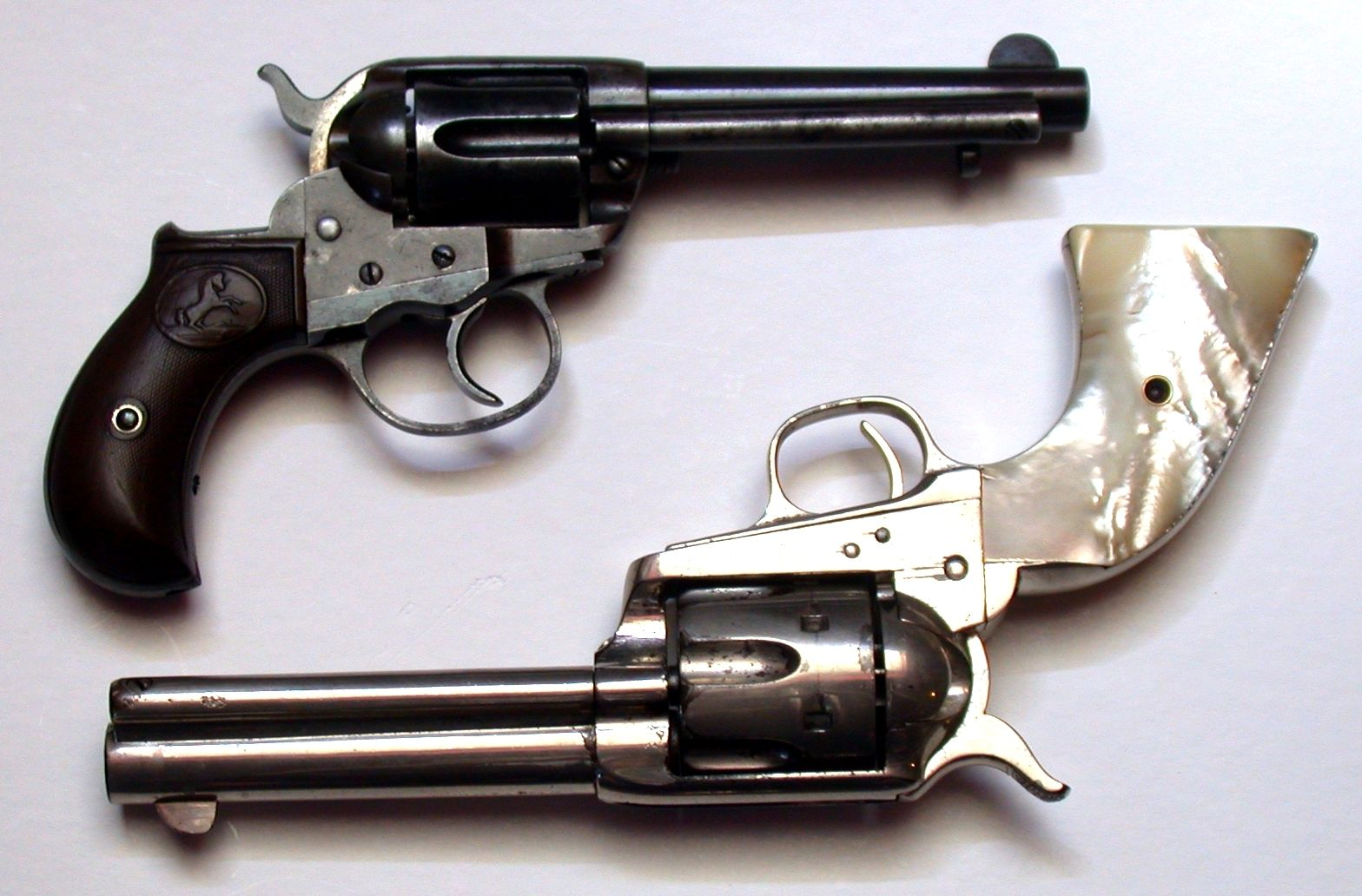
Colt "Thunderer" with ejector rod (above), compared to Colt Single-Action Army (below).

The Colt M1877 was a double-action revolver manufactured by Colt's Patent Fire Arms from January 1877 until 1909 for a total of 166,849 revolvers. The Model 1877 was offered in three calibers, which lent them three unofficial names: the "Thunderer", the "Lightning", and the "Rainmaker". The principal difference between the models was the cartridge for which they were chambered: for the "Thunderer", .41 Long Colt; for the "Lightning", .38 Long Colt; and for the "Rainmaker", .32 Long Colt. All of the models had a six-round capacity.

== History ==
The M1877 was designed by one of the inventors of the Colt Single Action Army (M1873), William Mason, as Colt's first attempt at manufacturing a double-action revolver. It was the first successful US-made double-action cartridge revolver, and was offered from the factory in two basic finishes: nickel-plated or a blued with a case-colored frame. The revolver was available in barrel lengths from 2 1/2 to 7 1/2 inches and with or without the ejector rod and housing. The shorter-barreled versions without the ejector rod were marketed as "shopkeeper's specials" for use as a concealable pocket pistol.

Neither of the names, "Lightning" or "Thunderer" were Colt designations, nor used by the factory in any reference materials. Both terms were coined by Benjamin Kittredge, one of Colt's major distributors. Kittredge was responsible for the terms "Peacemaker" for the Single Action Army, "Omnipotent" for the Colt M1878 double-action (often known as the "Frontier" model), and nicknames for the various chamberings of the New Line models.

The M1877's early double-action mechanism proved to be both intricate and delicate, thus it was vulnerable to failure of self cocking. The design had a garnered a negative reputation and earned the nickname "the watchmakers nightmare ". Because of the intricate design and difficulty of repair, gunsmiths to this day dislike working on them. Gun Digest referred to it as "the worst double-action trigger mechanism ever made". Typically, the trigger spring would fail and this would reduce the revolver to single-action fire only. Outwardly, the Model 1877 shows a striking resemblance to the Colt Single Action Army revolver, however, it is scaled down slightly and much smaller in dimension. The bird's head grips were of checkered rosewood on the early guns and hard rubber on the majority of later-production guns. Throughout the production run of the Model 1877 it was never rated for firing smokeless powder cartridges. The boxes of these guns near the end of the production run, were printed with a warning that stated "NOT ADAPTED FOR SMOKELESS POWDER". As a result, all Colt Model 1877 revolvers should be considered black powder cartridge only guns.

The "Lightning" was the favored personal weapon of famous Manchester (United Kingdom) Victorian detective, and then head of CID, Jerome Caminada. Old West outlaw John Wesley Hardin frequently used both "Lightning" and "Thunderer" versions, and the "Thunderer" was the preferred weapon of Billy the Kid, even carried by him when he was killed by Pat Garrett in 1881. Doc Holliday was also known to carry a nickel-plated "Thunderer" in his waistband as an accompanying gun to his nickel-plated Colt Single Action Army. Both revolvers had ivory or pearl grips.

== In popular culture ==
- The song "41 Thunderer" by Dave Carter and Tracy Grammer is a reference to the 1877 Colt Thunderer revolver chambered in the .41 Long Colt cartridge.
- In the 1993 film Tombstone, the character Doc Holliday (played by Val Kilmer) carries an 1877 Colt Lightning as well as a Colt Single Action Army.

== See also ==
- Colt M1878
