= William Mason (gunsmith) =

American gunsmith (1837–1913)

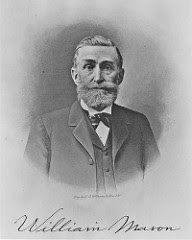
- Born: January 30, 1837; Oswego, New York, U.S.
- Died: July 17, 1913 (aged 76); Worcester, Massachusetts, U.S.
- Occupations: Inventor, machinist, gunsmith

William Mason (January 30, 1837 – July 17, 1913) was a patternmaker, engineer and inventor who worked for Remington Arms, Colt's Patent Fire Arms Manufacturing Company, and Winchester Repeating Arms Company in the 19th century.

== Remington ==
Mason began his career as an apprentice patternmaker, eventually working in the arms industry for Remington Arms. While at Remington, on November 21, 1865, he received U.S. patent 51,117, for a swing-out cylinder for easy loading, a design used in 1896 by S&W for the .38 Hand Ejector (M&P and S&W Model 10).

== Colt ==
Mason left Remington Arms in 1866 to work for Colt as the superintendent of the armory. Along with Charles Richards, Mason patented designs to convert percussion revolvers into rear-loading metallic cartridge revolvers. Those converted revolvers are identified as the "Richards-Mason conversion". After working on these conversions, Mason began work on Colt's first metallic cartridge revolvers in 1871: the Colt Model 1871-72 "Open Top" revolver was the third such pistol, following the .41 caliber House Pistol and the .22 caliber seven-shot Open Top. The Open Top .44 was a completely new design and the parts would not interchange with the older percussion pistols. Mason moved the rear sight to the rear of the barrel as opposed to the hammer or the breechblock of the earlier efforts. The caliber was .44 Henry and it was submitted to the US Army for testing in 1872. The Army rejected the pistol and asked for a more powerful caliber with a stronger frame. Mason redesigned the frame to incorporate a top strap, similar to the Remington revolvers and placed the rear sight on the rear of the frame. The first prototype was chambered in .44 rimfire, but the first model was in the newest caliber known as the .45 Colt.

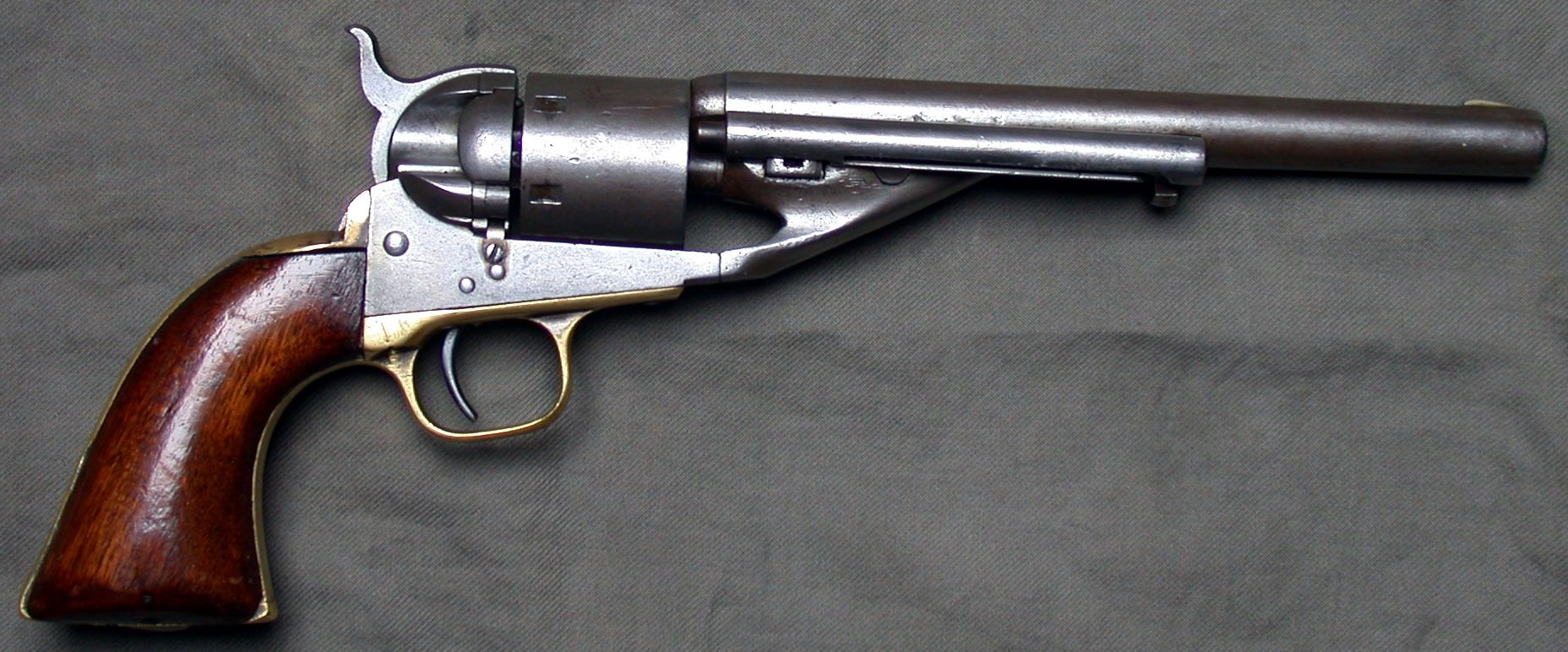
Colt Navy Model 1861 Richards Mason Conversion .38 cal

The revolver was chosen by the Army in 1872, with the first order shipping in the summer of 1873 for 8,000 revolvers. After the success of the Colt Single Action Army and Colt's conversion of existing percussion revolvers to Richards-Mason conversions, Mason went on to design Colt's smallest revolver, "The New Line" in 1874. There were five variants, each differing in size and caliber, but all using a breechblock designed by Mason.

While Colt had first developed the concept of a "double-action" revolver as early as 1857 and a patent was filed, it was never built by Colt. With increased competition from their British rival, Webley & Scott, Colt had Mason design a double-action revolver for them in 1877, the Colt M1877. Following this, Mason once again teamed up with Richards to produce a larger framed version, the Colt M1878 Frontier in 1878.

His final design for Colt was the Colt M1889, a collaboration with Carl J. Ehbets for a revolver with a swing-out cylinder. Ehbets continued to perfect the idea for 7 years after Mason left Colt for Winchester.

== Winchester ==
Mason left Colt to work for the Winchester Repeating Arms Company in 1882. While he was originally hired to design a revolver to compete with Colt's revolvers, Mason eventually made working prototypes of many of John Moses Browning's designs. One of his more notable design improvements was the Winchester Model 1886 rifle. In 1885 he became the Master Mechanic at Winchester and held that position until his death in Worcester, Massachusetts on July 17, 1913.

In the 1880s, Mason advised Murata Tsuneyoshi on structural and mechanical improvements to the Murata rifle.

Mason was an inaugural member of the American Society of Mechanical Engineers and over the course of his life he patented 125 inventions for firearms, ammunition, firearm manufacturing machinery, steam pumps and power looms. Winchester historian Mary Jo Ignoffo called Mason, "one of the most significant designers of the nineteenth century".
