= Elisha K. Root =

- Born: Elisha Root; May 5, 1808; Ludlow, Massachusetts, United States
- Died: September 1, 1865 (aged 57); Hartford, Connecticut, United States
- Occupations: Inventor, businessman
- Spouse: Matilda
- Children: Darius Root

Elisha King Root (May 5, 1808 - September 1, 1865) was a Connecticut machinist, inventor, and President of Colt's Manufacturing Company.

Root was born on a Massachusetts farm and worked as a bobbin boy in a cotton mill before switching, at the age of 15, to working in a machine shop in Ware, Massachusetts. At age 24 he was hired by Connecticut industrialist Samuel W. Collins to work in his axe factory in Collinsville, a village of Canton, Connecticut.

According to historian Diana Muir writing in Reflections in Bullough's Pond, Root "reconceptualized" the making of axes. Until his invention, axes were made by "flattening wrought iron, folding it around a steel pin, and forging the two sides together under a trip hammer." Root arranged "a series of dies and rollers that could 'die forge' -or apply pressure to a mold, forming a piece of hot wrought iron into the shape of an ax, with an eye already punched to receive the handle." According to Muir, Root next automated the tempering of axes by inventing a machine that moved ax heads through a temperature-regulated oven on a rotating wheel. And a machine that "shaved" the axes to give them a sharp edge, so that they needed only a small amount of finishing on a grindstone.

In 1849 Samuel Colt hired Root to come work in his Hartford firearms factory as a superintendent. Root performed this role with great success, developing many star employees.

It was while working for Colt that Root perfected the Lincoln miller milling machine, 150,000 of which were sold in the late 19th century, making it the most important American machine tool of the era. He modernized firearms production at Colt by designing state of the art drop hammers, boring machines, gauges, jigs, etc. Root also improved the milling machine invented by Simeon North and improved by the Robbins and Lawrence Company of Vermont and by Francis A. Pratt of the George S. Lincoln company in Hartford, Connecticut. The improved tool was known as the Lincoln Miller.

The Colt Model 1855 Sidehammer Pocket Revolver, or Colt Root Revolver, was named in honor of the engineer, and saw use during the American Civil War.

After Colt's death in 1862, Root took over as president of Colt's Patent Firearms until his death on September 1, 1865.

== See also ==
- History of Connecticut industry
- Simeon North
- John H. Hall (gunsmith)

== Bibliography ==
- Muir, Diana (2000). Reflections in Bullough's Pond: Economy and Ecosystem in New England. New Hampshire: University Press of New England. ISBN 978-0-87451-909-9.
- Roe, Joseph Wickham (1916), English and American Tool Builders, New Haven, Connecticut: Yale University Press, LCCN 16011753. Reprinted by McGraw-Hill, New York and London, 1926 (LCCN 27-24075); and by Lindsay Publications, Inc., Bradley, Illinois (ISBN 978-0-917914-73-7).
