= Charles Brinckerhoff Richards =

American engineer

Charles B. Richards
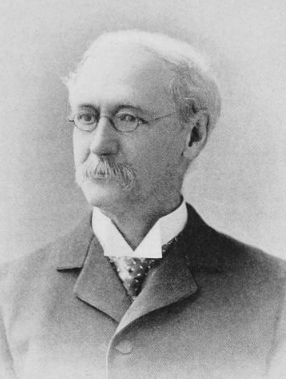
- Born: Charles Brinckerhoff Richards; December 23, 1833; Brooklyn, New York, United States
- Died: April 20, 1919 (aged 85); New Haven, Connecticut, United States
- Occupations: Inventor, gunsmith, engineer, Yale University professor
- Spouse: Agnes Edwards Goodwin (m. 1858)
- Children: George B. Richards, Harriet Roosevelt Richards
- Relatives: Charles Cutler Torrey (son-in-law)

Charles Brinckerhoff Richards (December 23, 1833 – April 20, 1919) was an engineer who worked for Colt's Patent Fire Arms Co., where he was responsible for the development of the Colt Single Action Army revolver. Richards was a founder of the American Society of Mechanical Engineers and a professor at Yale University where he taught for 25 years.

== Early life ==
Richards was born in Brooklyn, New York, to Thomas Fanning Richards and Harriet Howland Brinckerhoff. He attended private schools in Long Island and in New Jersey, showing an aptitude for the sciences. At 18 he apprenticed at Woodruff & Beach, a heavy equipment manufacturing plant, under William Wright. Following this apprenticeship, he worked at the Colt plant in Hartford, Connecticut, from 1855 to 1858. He left Colt in 1858 to take a position as a foreman in a New York plant manufacturing steam valves. That same year he married Agnes Edwards Goodwin.

== Engineering ==
In 1859, Richards opened an office in New York City as a patent solicitor and design engineer. He invented the Richards Steam engine indicator in 1860, which was hailed as the most significant improvement to the steam engine since the days of James Watt.

=== The Colt years ===
After the onset of the American Civil War he returned to Colt in 1861, eventually becoming Superintendent of Engineering at the factory in Hartford, Connecticut. Richards' first major post Civil War design was Colt's second attempt at metallic cartridge conversion known as the "Richards Conversion". Colt's revolvers to this point had been black powder percussion pistols, where the shooter had to pour black powder into each of the six chambers, ram a bullet on top and place a percussion cap on the nipple at the rear of each of the chambers. However, the US Army wanted a revolver that held metallic cartridges, which Colt could not produce because the Rollin White patent was still held by rival Smith & Wesson. Colt's only solution would be to bore through the rear of their cylinders and devise a new method of ignition and case extraction. The Richards Conversion was performed on the Colt 1860 Army revolver. The caliber was .44 Colt and the loading lever was replaced by an ejector rod. This conversion added a breech plate with a firing pin and a rear sight mounted on the breech plate. Colt manufactured 9000 of these revolvers between 1873 and 1878. In 1873 Colt performed the same conversion on the M1851 and M1861 revolvers for the US Navy in .38 rimfire. Along with William Mason he was granted patents from 1871 to convert percussion revolvers into rear-loading metallic cartridges revolvers. Those converted revolvers are nowadays identified as the "Richards-Mason Conversion". There were approximately 2100 Richard-Mason M1860 Army Conversions made from 1877 to 1878 in a serial number range 5800 to 7900.

Richards and Mason were later responsible for the design of the Colt Single Action Army revolver, also known as the "Peacemaker". Five years after the introduction of the Single Action Army and two years before his retirement, he once again teamed up with Mason to produce a larger framed double-action revolver, the Colt M1878 Frontier.

=== After Colt ===
After retiring from Colt in 1880, Richards was one of the founders of the American Society of Mechanical Engineers, serving as its manager from 1881 to 1882 and Vice-president from 1888–1890. From 1884 to 1909 Richards was the chair of Mechanical Engineering at Yale University, Sheffield Scientific School. Richards was the editor of engineering and technical works in Webster’s International Dictionary of the English Language in 1890.

Richards was the United States Commissioner of the Paris Exposition of 1889 and a recipient of the Chevalier of the Legion of Honor of France. He was a member of the Connecticut Academy of Arts and Sciences.

Richards died in New Haven, Connecticut on April 20, 1919. His daughter Harriet Roosevelt Richards (1867–1932) was a noted book illustrator; his daughter Marian Edwards Richards married historian Charles Cutler Torrey.
