= Anne Warner (novelist) =

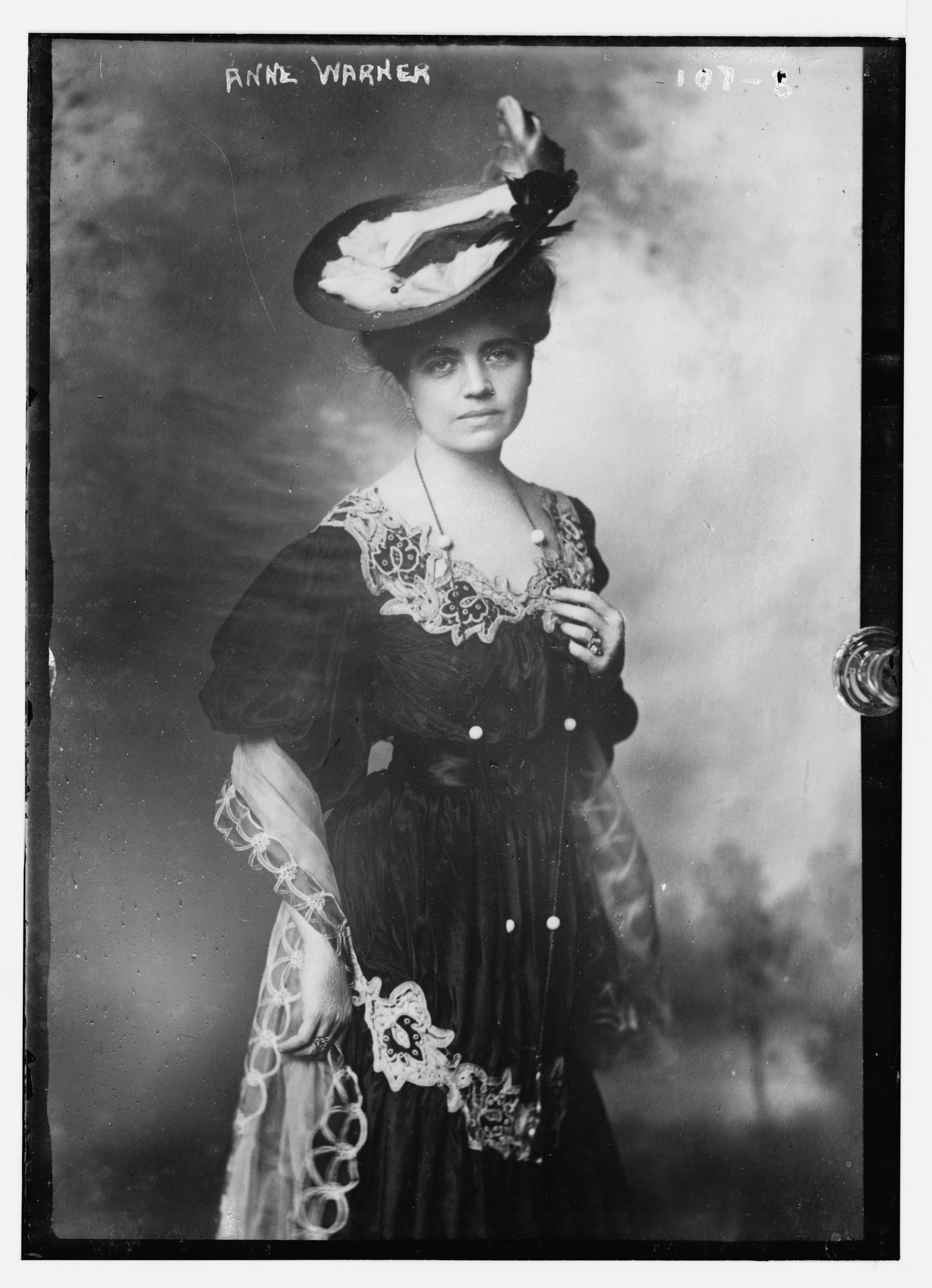
- Born: October 14, 1869; Saint Paul
- Died: February 3, 1913 (aged 43); Dorset
- Occupation: Writer

Anne Richmond Warner French (October 14, 1869 – February 3, 1913) was an American popular humorous author, best known for her local color stories about the character Susan Clegg.

Anne Warner was born on October 14, 1869 in Saint Paul, Minnesota, the daughter of lawyer William Penn Warner and Anna Elizabeth Richmond. In 1888, when she was 18, she married Charles Elting French, a Minneapolis flour manufacturer twenty five years older than her. They had two children: Anna Hathaway French (April 6 1892-December 17, 1892) and Charles Elting French (born September 19, 1896).

Her first published work was an extensive family genealogy, An American Ancestry (1894). She lived for two years in Tours, France and published her first novel, His Story, Their Letters (1902), a story told in conversations of a man and a woman who fall in love in Tours but eventually marry other people. She moved back to Saint Paul in 1903, but soon returned to Europe permanently, living in Hildesheim, Germany and Marnhull, Dorset, England.

Other novels by Warner include A Woman's Will (1904), about an American widow courted by a German musician, and The Rejuvenation of Aunt Mary (1905), a family drama about an aunt who disinherits and then reconciles with her nephew. Warner's most popular works were about Susan Clegg, a woman who retells local gossip to her friend Mrs. Lathrop, who is often asleep in her rocking chair.

Warner died of a cerebral hemorrhage on 3 February 1913 in Dorset.

== Bibliography ==
- An American Ancestry (1894).
- His Story, Their Letters (1902).
- A Woman's Will (1904).
- Susan Clegg and Her Friend Mrs. Lathrop (1904).
- The Rejuvenation of Aunt Mary (1905).
- Seeing France with Uncle John (1906).
- Susan Clegg and Her Love Affairs (1906).
- Susan Clegg and Her Neighbors' Affairs (1906).
- Susan Clegg and a Man in the House (1907).
- An Original Gentleman (1908).
- The Panther: A Tale of Temptation (1908).
- Seeing England with Uncle John (1908).
- In a Mysterious Way (1909).
- Your Child and Mine (1909).
- Just Between Themselves: A Book About Dichtenberg (1910).
- Susan Clegg, Her Friend and Her Neighbors (1910).
- How Leslie Loved (1911).
- When Woman Proposes (1911).
- The Gay and Festive Claverhouse: An Extravaganza by Anne Warner (1914).
- Sunshine Jane (1914).
- The Taming of Amaretti: A Comedy of Manners (1915).
- The Tigress (1916).
