= Colt Model 1855 Sidehammer Pocket Revolver =

Colt Model 1855 Sidehammer
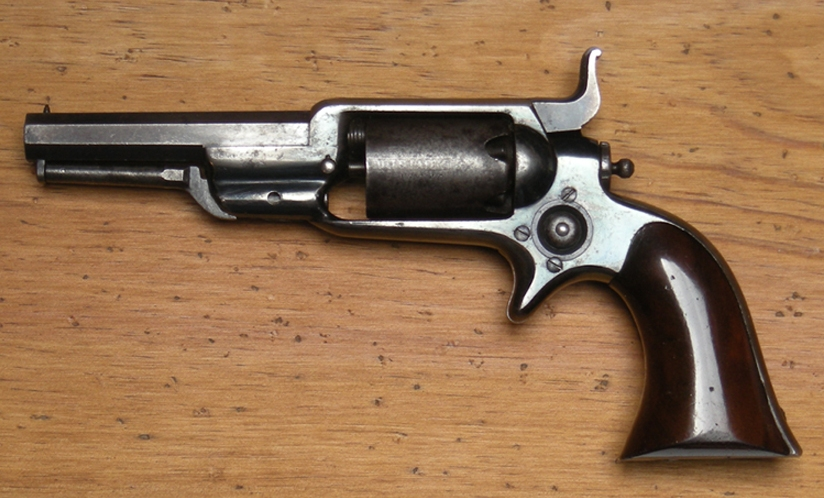
- Colt Root 1855 Revolver, Model 2, cal .28
- Type: Revolver
- Place of origin: United States

Service history
- Used by: United States
- Wars: American Civil War

Production history
- Designer: Elisha K. Root and Samuel Colt
- Designed: 1855
- Manufacturer: Colt Firearms
- Produced: c. 1855–1870
- No. built: .28 caliber = 30,000.31 caliber = 14,000

Specifications
- Mass: 17-ounces (3.5-inches octagon barrel)
- Length: 8-inches (with 3.5-inch barrel)
- Barrel length: 3.5- or 4.5-inches
- Caliber: .31 ball/conical bullet, .28 ball/conical bullet
- Action: Single-action
- Muzzle velocity: 7-800 feet per second
- Effective firing range: 25 yards (accurate defense)
- Feed system: 5-round cylinder
- Sights: Post front sight, topstrap notch rear sight

The Colt Model 1855 Sidehammer, also known as the Colt Root Revolver after engineer Elisha K. Root (1808–1865), was a cap & ball single-action pocket revolver used during the American Civil War. It was made by the Colt's Patent Fire Arms Manufacturing Company

== Calibers and variants ==
In the revolver configuration of the patented revolving mechanism, only one model of the revolver was produced. Two calibers for the revolver were: .28 and .31. The production of the revolver started in 1855 and lasted until 1870. In spite of the complexity and ambition of its patented design, the Sidehammer revolver never became a popular gun.

=== Model series ===
Production began in 1855 with the Model 1 followed by the Model 1A and then the Model 2 beginning with serial number "1" and ending in 1860 at about "25,000". These models had a roller-die engraved scene referred to as the "Cabin and Indian" scene. Production continued with the Model 3 which has a fluted cylinder

=== Barrels, cylinders ===
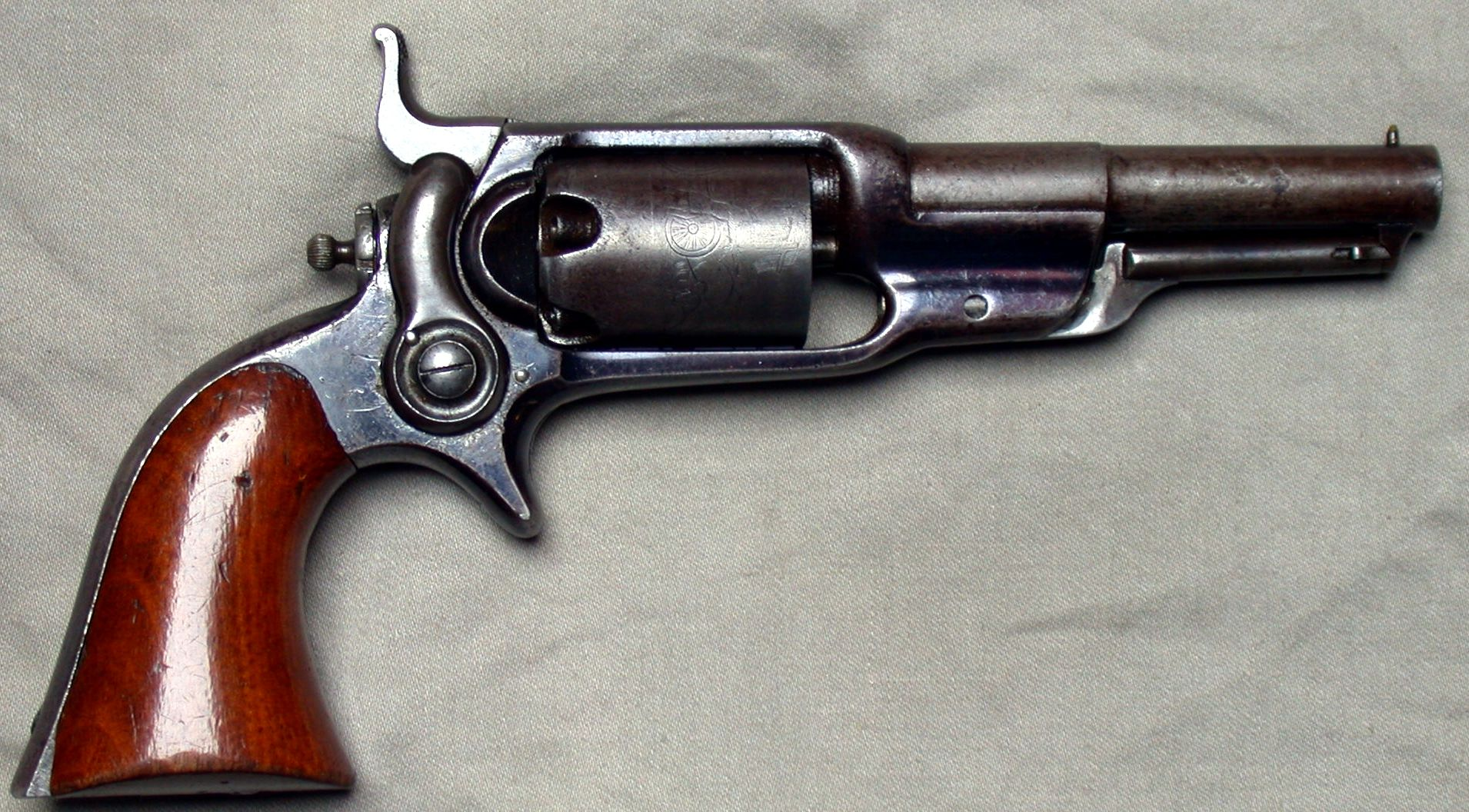
Colt Root 1855 Revolver, Model 7, cal .31

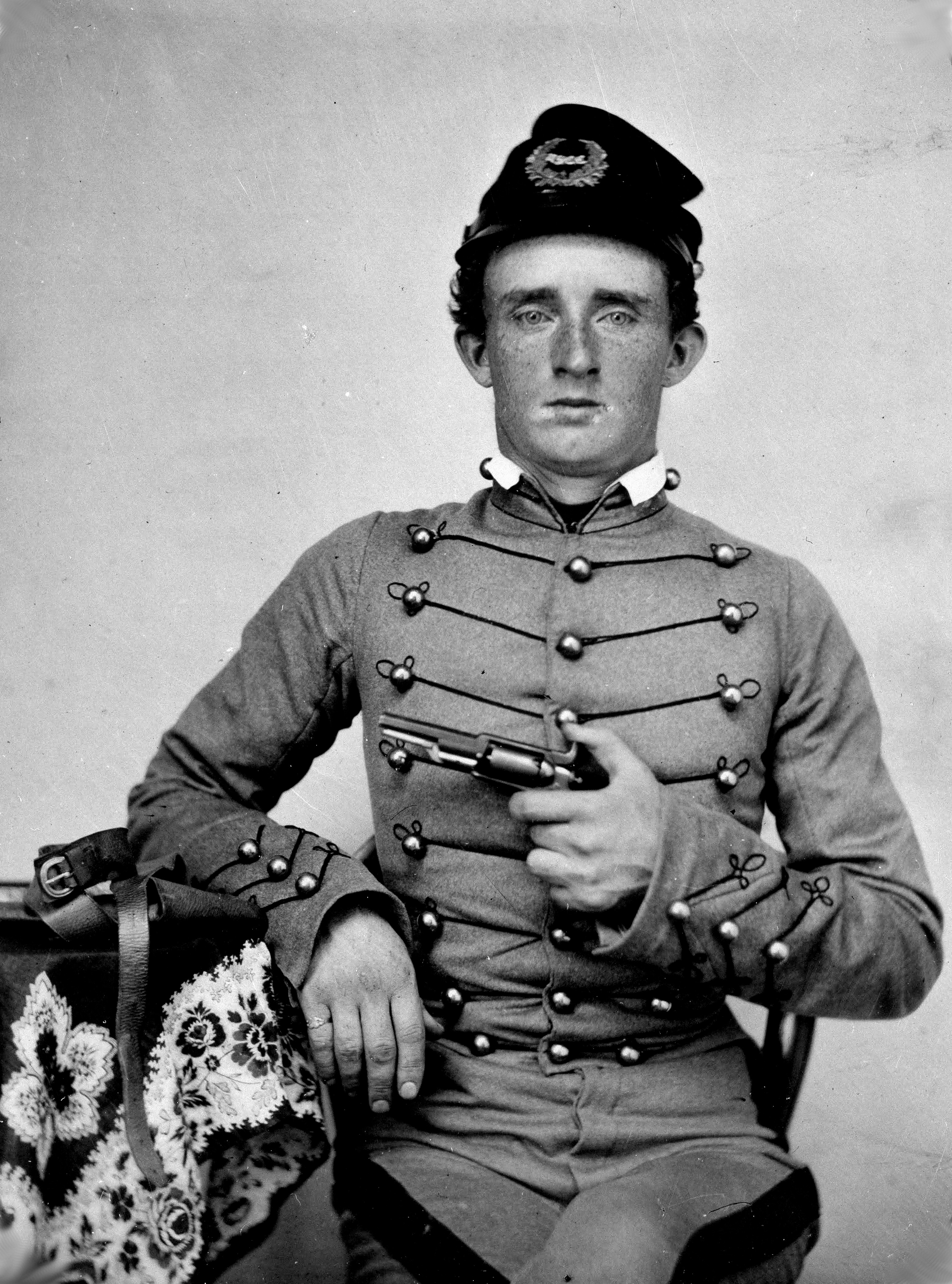
USMA Cadet George Armstrong Custer with Colt Sidehammer pistol about 1859

The standard barrel length was 3 1/2 inches (4 1/2 inches for the Model 5A, 6A, and 7A). Calibers were .28 (Model 1 - 3). .31 (Models 3A, 4, 5, 6, 7). Octagon barrels (Model 1 - 4). Round barrels (Model 5 - 7).

The cylinder scene engraved on the first 25,000 pistols was created by banknote engraver Waterman Ormsby. The image was his fourth and last to be featured on Colt revolvers. The overall scene is 1-1/16 inch wide by 3 1/4-inch long. At one end of the scene is the text, "COLT'S PATENT No. [serial number]". The image contains a pioneer defending himself against an attack by six Indians in Seminole-style attire using a pair of revolver pistols while (presumably) his wife and child are escaping. Along the top of the scene (the edge of the cylinder which is closest to the pistol barrel) is a "finely detailed wavy line and dot border".

Models 3, 4, and 5 had a fluted cylinder (with indentations between the loading chambers), preventing the application of a continuously engraved scene. Some cylinders were decoratively hand-engraved.

Models 6 and 7 had a round cylinder, with the rolled-on "Stagecoach Holdup" scene by W. L. Ormsby.

== Influences in later Colt firearms ==
In 1855, the Sidehammer was the first Colt revolver to use the "creeping" loading lever. This loading mechanism was subsequently used in the design of the Colt Army Model 1860, Colt Navy Model 1861, and Colt Police Model 1862.

The Sidehammer was the also Colt's first solid-frame, spur-trigger gun. This anatomical characteristic was not used again until the three models of the Colt Derringer started production in 1870. For the two first models, production lasted until 1890, while the third model continued until 1912 (and was re-released in the 1950s for Western movies, as the fourth model Colt Derringer). The solid-frame spur-trigger design of the Colt Derringers was still present in the patent when Colt purchased the National Arms Company in 1870. Actual original Colt models subsequent to the Sidehammer, and inheriting a solid frame and a spur trigger, were the Colt House (1871) and the Colt New Line (1873).

The revolving mechanism of the cylinder was also used by Colt in the following long arms, in rifle and carbine configurations:

- Colt Model 1855 "First Model" Sporting Rifle
- Colt Model 1855 Half Stock Sporting Rifle
- Colt Model 1855 Full Stock Sporting Rifle
- Colt Model 1855 Military Rifle and Rifled Musket
- Colt Model 1855 Revolving Carbine
- Colt Model 1855 Revolving Shotgun

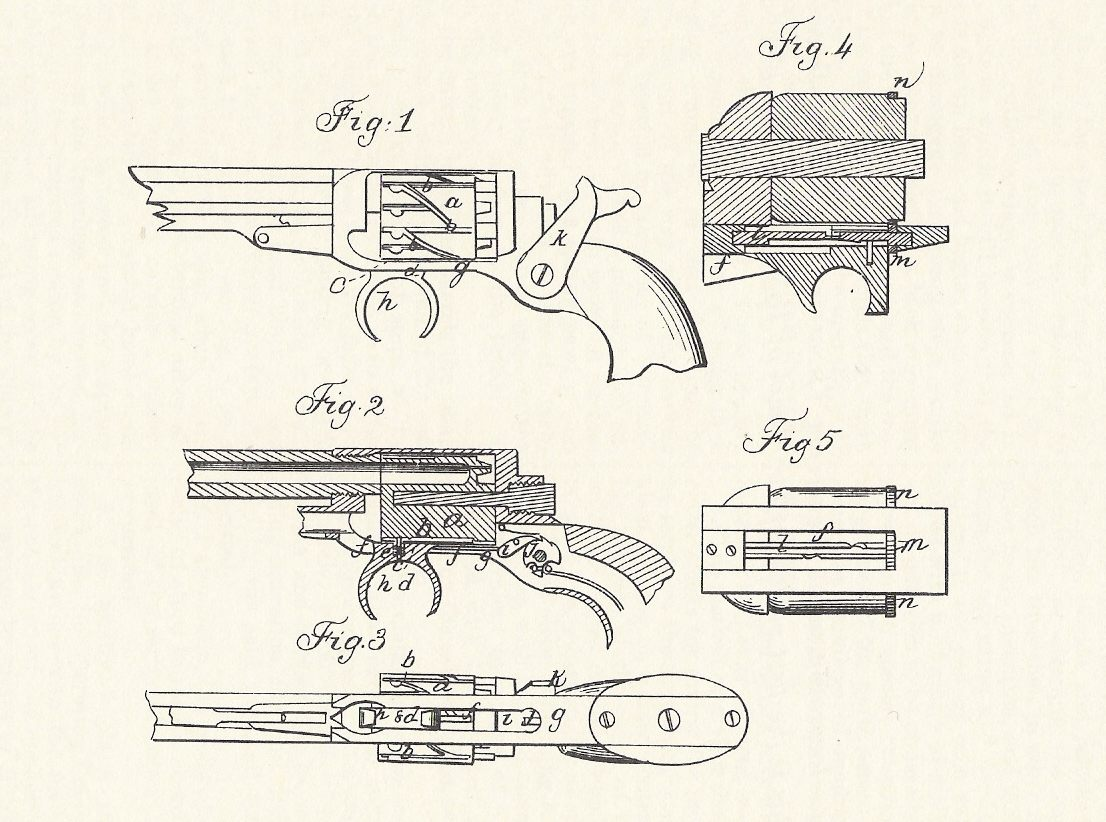
Original 1855 patent of the gun, still with the zig-zag cylinder
