= List of firearms (C) =

This is a list of small arms whose manufacturer or name (in the case of no known or multiple manufacturers) starts with the letter C—including pistols, shotguns, sniper rifles, submachine guns, personal defense weapons, assault rifles, battle rifles, designated marksman rifles, carbines, machine guns, flamethrowers, multiple-barrel firearms, grenade launchers, anti-tank rifles, and any other variants.

== List ==
- Cabela's
- Rifles
- Cabela's .41 Bolt Action Rifle
- Calico Light Weapons Systems
- Pistols
- Calico M110(US – Semi-Automatic Pistol – .22 LR)
- Calico M950(US – Semi-Automatic Pistol 9×19mm Parabellum)
- Rifles
- Calico Liberty (US – Semi-Automatic Rifle 9×19mm Parabellum)
- Calico Liberty II(US – Semi-Automatic Rifle – 9×19mm Parabellum)
- Calico Liberty III(US – Semi-Automatic Pistol – 9×19mm Parabellum)
- Calico M100(US – Semi-Automatic Carbine – .22 LR)
- Calico M100P(US – Semi-Automatic Pistol – .22 LR)
- Calico M105 (US – Semi-Automatic Carbine – .22 LR)
  - Submachine Guns
- Calico M900S(US – Submachine Gun – 9×19mm Parabellum)
- Calico M900A(US – Submachine Gun – 9×19mm Parabellum)
- Calico M960A(US – Submachine Gun – 9×19mm Parabellum)
- Caliver(Various Countries – Muzzle-Loaded Firearm – Various Calibers)
- Campo Giro Pistol (Spain – Semi-Automatic Pistol)
- Campo-Giro Model 1904(Spain – Semi-Automatic Pistol – .32 ACP)
- Campo-Giro Model 1913(Spain – Semi-Automatic Pistol – 9×23mm Largo)
- Campo-Giro Model 1913/16 (Spain – Semi-Automatic Pistol – 9×23mm Largo)
- Canadian Army Designations
  - Machine Guns
- C3 Machine Gun(US, Canada – Medium Machine Gun – 7.62×51mm NATO: Licensed Production Browning M1919A4 Variant)
- C6 GPMG(Belgium, Canada – General-Purpose Machine Gun – 7.62×51mm NATO: Licensed Production FN MAG)
- C9(Belgium, Canada – Light Machine Gun – 5.56×45mm NATO: Licensed Production FN Minimi)
- C9A1 (Belgium – Light Machine Gun – 5.56×45mm NATO)
- C9A2 (Belgium – Light Machine Gun – 5.56×45mm NATO)
  - Rifles
- C1 (Belgium, Canada – Semi-Automatic Rifle – 7.62×51mm NATO: Licensed Production FN FAL)
- C1A1 (Belgium, Canada – Semi-Automatic Rifle – 7.62×51mm)
- C1A1D (Belgium, Canada – Semi-Automatic Rifle – 7.62×51mm NATO)
- C1D (Belgium, Canada – Semi-Automatic Rifle – 7.62×51mm NATO)
- C2 (Belgium, Canada – Squad Automatic Weapon – 7.62×51mm NATO: Licensed Production FN LAR 50.41/42)
- C2A1 SAW(Belgium, Canada – Squad Automatic Weapon – 7.62×51mm NATO)
- C3 Sniper Rifle (UK, Canada – Bolt-Action Sniper Rifle – 7.62×51mm NATO: Licensed Production Parker Hale M82)
- C3A1 (UK, Canada – Bolt-Action Sniper Rifle – 7.62×51mm NATO)
- C7(US, Canada – Assault Rifle – 5.56×45mm NATO: Licensed Production Armalite AR-15 Variant)
- C7A1 (Canada – Assault Rifle – 5.56×45mm NATO)
- C7A2(Canada – Assault Rifle – 5.56×45mm NATO)
- C7CT(Canada – Designated Marksman Rifle – 5.56×45mm NATO)
- C7 LSW (US, Canada – Squad Automatic Weapon – 5.56×45mm NATO: Licensed Production Colt Automatic Rifle)
- C8 (Canada – Carbine – 5.56×45mm NATO)
- C8A1 (Canada – Carbine – 5.56×45mm NATO)
- C8A2 (Canada – Carbine – 5.56×45mm NATO)
- C8A3 (Canada – Carbine – 5.56×45mm NATO: In Development)
- Diemaco C8CT (Canada – Designated Marksman Rifle – 5.56×45mm NATO)
- Diemaco C8CQB (Canada – Carbine – 5.56×45mm NATO)
- Diemaco C8FTHB(Canada – Carbine – 5.56×45mm NATO)
- Diemaco C8PDW (Canada – Personal Defense Weapon – 5.56×45mm NATO)
- Diemaco C8SFW (Canada – Carbine – 5.56×45mm NATO)
- C10 Training Rifle (Canada – Training Rifle – .22 LR)
- C11 (Canada – Single-Shot Target Rifle – 7.62×51mm NATO)
- C12A1(Canada – Single-Shot Target Rifle – 7.62×51mm NATO)
- C14 Timberwolf MRSWS (Canada – Bolt-Action Sniper Rifle – .338 Lapua Magnum)
- C15 LRSW (Canada – Bolt-Action Anti-Materiel Rifle – .50 BMG: Licensed Production McMillan Tac-50)
  - Submachine Guns
- C1 Submachine Gun (UK, Canada – Submachine Gun – 9×19mm Parabellum: Licensed Production Sterling Submachine Gun)
- Canadian Arsenals Limited
- CAL XP-54 (Canada - submachine gun - 9×19mm Parabellum)
- Cane Gun
- Calzada Bayo CB-57 (Spain – Battle Rifle – 7.62×51mm NATO)
- Carcano M38 Short Rifle (Italy – Bolt Action Rifle – 7.35 × 51 mm Carcano)
- Carcano M38 Cavalry Carbine(Italy – Bolt Action Carbine – 7.35 × 51 mm Carcano)
- Carcano M38 TS Special Troop Carbine (Italy – Bolt Action Carbine – 7.35 × 51 mm Carcano)
- Carcano M38S Cavalry Carbine(Italy – Bolt Action Carbine – 7.92 × 57 mm Mauser)
- Carcano M38S TS Special Troop Carbine (Italy – Bolt Action Carbine – 7.92 × 57 mm Mauser)
- Carcano M91(Italy – Bolt Action Rifle – 6.5 × 52 mm Carcano)
- Carcano M91 Cavalry Carbine(Italy – Bolt Action Carbine – 6.5 × 52 mm Carcano)
- Carcano M91 TS Special Troop Carbine (Italy – Bolt Action Carbine – 6.5 × 52 mm Carcano)
- Carcano M91/24 TS Special Troop Carbine (Italy – Bolt Action Carbine – 6.5 × 52 mm Carcano)
- Carcano M91/28 TS Special Troop Carbine (Italy – Bolt Action Carbine – 6.5 × 52 mm Carcano)
- Carcano M91/38 Short Rifle (Italy – Bolt Action Rifle – 6.5 × 52 mm Carcano)
- Carcano M91/38 Cavalry Carbine (Italy – Bolt Action Carbine – 6.5 × 52 mm Carcano)
- Carcano M91/38 TS Special Troop Carbine (Italy – Bolt Action Carbine – 6.5 × 52 mm Carcano)
- Carcano M91/41 (Italy – Bolt Action Rifle – 6.5 × 52 mm Carcano)
- Carcano Type I (Italy – Bolt Action Rifle – 6.5 × 50 mm Japanese)
- Carcano Balilla (Italy – Bolt Action Carbine – 5.5 mm, 6.5 mm & 6.8 mm: Youth Model for the ONB)
- Carl Gustafs Stads Gevärsfaktori
  - Rifles
- Ag m/42(Sweden – Semi-Automatic Rifle – 6.5×55mm)
- Ag m/42B(Sweden – Semi-Automatic Rifle – 6.5×55mm)
- Cei-Rigotti (Italy – Automatic Rifle – 6.5×52mm)
- Česká zbrojovka firearms
  - Launchers
- ČZW-40 (Czech Republic – Grenade Launcher – 40×53mm)
- RAG-30 (Czech Republic – Grenade Launcher – VOG 17)
- SAG-30 (Czech Republic – Grenade Launcher – VOG 17)
  - Machine Guns
- ČZW-762(Czech Republic – Light Machine Gun – 7.62×39mm M43)
- Pistols
- CZ-75(Czech Republic – Semi-Automatic Pistol – 9×19mm Parabellum)
- CZ-75 B(Czech Republic – Semi-Automatic Pistol – 9×19mm Parabellum)
- CZ-75 AUTOMATIC(Czech Republic – Machine Pistol – 9×19mm Parabellum)
- CZ-75 BD(Czech Republic – Semi-Automatic Pistol – 9×19mm Parabellum)
- CZ-97 BD(Czech Republic – Semi-Automatic Pistol – .45 ACP)
- CZ-75 BD Police (Czech Republic – Semi-Automatic Pistol – 9×19mm Parabellum)
- CZ-75 B DAO (Czech Republic – Semi-Automatic Pistol – 9×19mm Parabellum, .40 S&W)
- CZ-75 B Omega (Czech Republic – Semi-Automatic Pistol – 9×19mm Parabellum, .40 S&W)
- CZ-75 B SA (Czech Republic – Single-Action Semi-Automatic Pistol – 9×19mm Parabellum, .40 S&W)
- CZ-75 B Stainless (Czech Republic – Semi-Automatic Pistol – 9×19mm Parabellum)
- CZ-75 Champion (Czech Republic – Semi-Automatic Pistol – 9×19mm Parabellum)
- CZ-75 Compact (Czech Republic – Compact Semi-Automatic Pistol – 9×19mm Parabellum, .40 S&W)
- CZ-75 Czechmate(Czech Republic – Semi-Automatic Pistol – 9×19mm Parabellum)
- CZ-75 Kadet(Czech Republic – Semi-Automatic Pistol – 9×19mm Parabellum)
- CZ-75 P-01(Czech Republic – Semi-Automatic Pistol – 9×19mm Parabellum)
- CZ-75 P-06(Czech Republic – Semi-Automatic Pistol – .40 S&W)
- CZ-75 P-07 DUTY (Czech Republic – Compact Semi-Automatic Pistol– 9×19mm Parabellum, .40 S&W)
- CZ-75 P-09 DUTY (Czech Republic – Semi-Automatic Pistol – 9×19mm Parabellum, .40 S&W)
- CZ-75 PČR Compact (Czech Republic – Compact Semi-Automatic Pistol – 9×19mm Parabellum)
- CZ-75 SemiCompact (Czech Republic – Semi-Automatic Pistol – 9×19mm Parabellum)
- CZ-75 SP-01 (Czech Republic – Semi-Automatic Pistol – 9×19mm Parabellum)
- CZ-75 SP-01 Phantom (Czech Republic – Semi-Automatic Pistol – 9×19mm Parabellum)
- CZ-75 SP-01 Shadow (Czech Republic – Semi-Automatic Pistol – 9×19mm Parabellum)
- CZ-75 SP-01 Tactical (Czech Republic – Semi-Automatic Pistol – 9×19mm Parabellum)
- CZ-75 Standard ISPC (Czech Republic – Semi-Automatic Pistol – 9×19mm Parabellum)
- CZ-75 Tactical Sports(Czech Republic – Semi-Automatic Pistol – 9×19mm Parabellum, .40 S&W)
- CZ-97 B(Czech Republic – Semi-Automatic Pistol – .45 ACP)
- CZ-2075 RAMI (Czech Republic – Subcompact Semi-Automatic Pistol – 9×19mm Parabellum, .40 S&W)
- CZ-2075 RAMI BD(Czech Republic – Subcompact Semi-Automatic Pistol – 9×19mm Parabellum, .40 S&W)
- CZ-2075 RAMI P (Czech Republic – Subcompact Semi-Automatic Pistol – 9×19mm Parabellum, .40 S&W)
- CZ-85(Czech Republic – Semi-Automatic Pistol – 9×19mm Parabellum)
- CZ-85 B (Czech Republic – Semi-Automatic Pistol – 9×19mm Parabellum, .40 S&W)
- CZ-85 BD(Czech Republic – Semi-Automatic Pistol – 9×19mm Parabellum, .40 S&W)
- CZ-85 Combat (Czech Republic – Semi-Automatic Pistol – 9×19mm Parabellum)
- CZ-85 Compact(Czech Republic – Compact Semi-Automatic Pistol – 9×19mm Parabellum, .40 S&W)
  - Rifles
- ČZW-127 (Czech Republic – Bolt-Action Anti-Material Rifle – 12.7×108mm)
- ČZW-556 (Czech Republic – Assault Rifle – 5.56×45mm NATO)
  - Submachine Guns
- ČZW-9 (Czech Republic – Submachine Gun – 9×19mm Parabellum)
- ČZW-9M (Czech Republic – Submachine Gun 9×19mm Parabellum)
- ČZW-9PS (Czech Republic – Submachine Gun 9×19mm Parabellum)
- ČZW-9FC (Czech Republic – Submachine Gun 9×19mm Parabellum)
- ČZW-438(Czech Republic – Personal Defence Weapon– 4.38×30mm Libra)
- ČZW-438 M9(Czech Republic – Submachine Gun– 9×19mm Parabellum)
- Central Research Institute for Precision Machine Building (TsNIITochMash)
  - Combination Weapons
- 80.002 (Union of Soviet Socialist Republics – G.A. Yanov, V.I. Chelikin, Yu.V. Minaev – 1975–1979 – Assault Rifle with Grenade Launcher – 5.45×39mm / 12.7mm Grenade: Combined assault rifle and grenade launcher based on the Russian AK-74. Never adopted by any military. Prototype only.)
  - Pistols
- SR-1 Vektor(Russian Federation – Piotr Serdyukov – Semi-Automatic Pistol – 9×21mm Gyurza)
- CETME
  - Machine Guns
- CETME Ameli(Spain – Light Machine Gun – 5.56×45mm NATO)
  - Rifles
- CETME Rifle (Spain – Battle Rifle)
- CETME Modelo A (Spain – Battle Rifle – 7.62×51mm NATO: Prototype)
- CETME Modelo A1 (Spain – Battle Rifle – 7.62×51mm NATO: Prototype)
- CETME Modelo B (Spain – Battle Rifle – 7.62×51mm CETME)
- CETME Modelo C (Spain Battle Rifle 7.62×51mm NATO)
- CETME Modelo E (Spain – Battle Rifle – 7.62×51mm CETME)
- CETME Modelo L (Spain – Assault Rifle – 5.56×45mm NATO)
- CETME Modelo LC (Spain – Assault Rifle – 5.56×45mm NATO)
- CETME Sporter (Spain – Semi-Automatic Rifle – 7.62×51mm NATO, .308)
  - Submachine Guns
- CETME C2(Spain – Submachine Gun – 9×19mm Parabellum)
- Chapina carbine(Brazil – Semi-Automatic Carbine – .30 Carbine)
- Charter Arms
  - Revolvers
- Charter Arms Bulldog(US – Double Action Revolver – .357 Magnum, .44 Special)
- Chauchat Light Machine Gun (France – Light Machine Gun)
- Chauchat Mle 1915 (France, Belgium – Light Machine Gun – 7.65×53mm Argentine(Belgian Conversion), 8×50mmR Lebel)
- Chauchat Mle 1918 (France – Light Machine Gun – .30–'06)
- RKM wz. 15 (France, Poland – Light Machine Gun – 7.92×57mm Mauser, 8×50mmR Lebel: Polish Designation)
- Chauchat-Ribeyrolles 1918 (France – Submachine Gun – 8×50mmR Lebel)
- China Lake NATIC (US – Pump-Action Grenade Launcher – 40×46mm SR)
- China South Industries Group
  - Rifles
- AMR-2 (China – Bolt-Action Anti-Materiel Rifle – 12.7×108mm)
- Chiesanova Rifle (Argentina – Straight-Pull Bolt-Action Rifle – 7.65×53mm Argentine)
- Christensen Arms Carbon Tactical (US – Bolt-Action Rifle – .338 Lapua Magnum)
- Chropei
  - Rifles
- Chropi Rifle (Greece – Assault Rifle – 7.62×51mm NATO)
  - Submachine Guns
- Chropi GP10(Greece – Submachine gun – 9×19mm Parabellum, .45 ACP)
- Ciener Ultimate Over/Under (US – Rifle-Mounted Pump-Action Shotgun – 12 Gauge: Remington 870 MPS Variant)
- Cimarron Firearms
  - Revolvers
- Wyatt Earp Buntline (US – Cimarron Firearms/Colt's Manufacturing Company – Unknown Date – Single-Action Revolver – .45 Colt: Variant of the American Colt Buntline Special. Features a shorter 10-inch barrel.)
- Claridge Hi-Tec, Inc.
- Claridge Hi-Tec Pistol (US – Semi-Automatic Pistol)
- Claridge Hi-Tec Pistol S9 (US – Semi-Automatic Pistol – 9×19mm Parabellum)
- Claridge Hi-Tec Pistol C9 (US – Semi-Automatic Pistol – 9×19mm Parabellum)
- Claridge Hi-Tec Pistol LEC9 (US – Semi-Automatic Pistol – 9×19mm Parabellum)
- Claridge Hi-Tec Pistol T9/L9 (US – Semi-Automatic Pistol – 9×19mm Parabellum)
- Claridge Hi-Tec Pistol S45 (US – Semi-Automatic Pistol – .45 ACP)
- Claridge Hi-Tec Pistol C45(US – Semi-Automatic Pistol – .45 ACP)
- Claridge Hi-Tec Pistol LEC45 (US – Semi-Automatic Pistol – .45 ACP)
- Claridge Hi-Tec Pistol T45/L45 (US – Semi-Automatic Pistol – .45 ACP)
- Cobray Company
  - Pistols
- Cobray M-10 (US – Machine Pistol – 9×19mm Parabellum, .45 ACP: Licensed Production MAC-10)
- Cobray M-11 (US – Machine Pistol – .380 ACP: Licensed Production MAC-11)
- Cobray M-11/9(US – Machine Pistol – 9×19mm Parabellum)
- Cobra Submachine Gun(Rhodesia Submachine Gun 9×19mm Parabellum)
- Cooey Machine & Arms Company
- Rifles
- Cooey Canuck(Canada – Single-Shot Bolt-Action Rifle – .22 LR, .25 Stevens Short)
- Cooey 60(Canada – Bolt-Action Rifle – .22 LR)
- Cooey 600 (Canada – Bolt-Action Rifle – .22 LR)
- Shotguns
- Cooey 84/840 (Canada – Single-Shot Break-Action Shotgun – 12 Gauge, 16 Gauge, 20 Gauge, 28 Gauge, .410 Bore)
- Colleoni machine gun (Italy – Machine Gun – 6.5×52mm Mannlicher–Carcano)
- Colt Canada
  - Launchers
- M203A1 (Canada/US – Diemaco/AAI Corporation – Early 1990s – Single-Shot Underslung Grenade Launcher – 40×46mm Grenade: Variant of the American M203A1 grenade launcher designed for use with the Colt Canada C7 assault rifle and its variants. Features a different mounting system and a 9-inch barrel.)
- Colt's Manufacturing Company
- Machine Guns
- Colt Monitor R80 (US – Light Machine Gun – .30–'06)
- Colt–Vickers M1915 (US – Heavy Machine Gun – .303 British)
- Pistols
- Colt Model 1900 (US – Semi-Automatic Pistol – .38 ACP)
- Colt Model 1902 (US – Semi-Automatic Pistol – .38 ACP)
- Colt Model 1902 Military (US – Semi-Automatic Pistol – .38 ACP)
- Colt Model 1902 Sporting (US – Semi-Automatic Pistol – .38 ACP)
- Colt Model 1905 (US – Semi-Automatic Pistol – .45 ACP)
- Colt Model 1905 Military (US – Semi-Automatic Pistol – .45 ACP)
- Colt Model 1905 Sporting (US – Semi-Automatic Pistol – .45 ACP)
- Colt Model 1903 Pocket Hammer(US – Semi-Automatic Pistol – .38 ACP)
- Colt Model 1903 Pocket Hammerless(US – Compact Semi-Automatic Pistol – .32 ACP)
- Colt Model 1908 Pocket Hammerless(US – Compact Semi-Automatic Pistol – .380 ACP)
- Colt Model 1908 Vest Pocket (US – Subcompact Semi-Automatic Pistol – .25 ACP)
- Colt M1911 (US – Semi-Automatic Pistol – .45 ACP)
- Colt Government Model (US – Semi-Automatic Pistol – 9×19mm Parabellum, .38 Super, .40 S&W, .45 ACP, 9x23 Winchester)
- Colt Government Model .380 (US – Semi-Automatic Pistol – .380 ACP)
- Colt Model 1907(US – Semi-Automatic Pistol – .45 ACP: Prototype)
- Colt Model 1909(US – Semi-Automatic Pistol – .45 ACP: Prototype)
- Colt Model 1910(US – Semi Automatic Pistol .45 ACP: Prototype)
- Colt M1911A1 (US – Semi-Automatic Pistol – .45 ACP)
- Colt M1911A2 (US – Semi-Automatic Pistol – .45 ACP: Prototype)
- Colt Ace(US – Semi-Automatic Pistol – .22 LR)
- Colt Service Model Ace (US – Semi-Automatic Pistol – .22 LR)
- Colt Commander (US – Pistol – 9×19mm Parabellum, .38 Super, & .45 ACP)
- Colt Combat Elite (US – Semi-Automatic Pistol – .38 Super, .45 ACP)
- Colt Commander C.C.O (US – Semi-Automatic Pistol – .45 ACP)
- Colt Commander Gold Cup (US – Semi-Automatic Pistol – .45 ACP)
- Colt Defender (US – Semi-Automatic Pistol – .40 S&W, .45 ACP)
- Colt Delta Elite(US – Semi-Automatic Pistol – 10mm Auto)
- Colt Delta Elite Variant 1 (US – Semi-Automatic Pistol – 10mm Auto)
- Colt Delta Elite Variant 1 Blued (US – Semi-Automatic Pistol – 10mm Auto)
- Colt Delta Elite Variant 1 Stainless (US – Semi-Automatic Pistol – 10mm Auto)
- Colt Delta Elite Variant 2(US – Semi-Automatic Pistol – 10mm Auto)
- Colt Delta Elite Variant 3(US – Semi-Automatic Pistol – 10mm Auto)
- Colt Delta Elite Variant 4(US – Semi-Automatic Pistol – 10mm Auto)
- Colt Elite Ten/Forty (US – Semi-Automatic Pistol – 10mm Auto, .40 S&W)
- Colt Double Eagle(US – Semi-Automatic Pistol – 9×19mm Parabellum, 10mm Auto, .38 Super, .45 ACP)
- Colt Double Eagle Commander(US – Semi-Automatic Pistol – .40 S&W, .45 ACP)
- Colt Double Eagle Mark II (US – Semi-Automatic Pistol – 9×19mm Parabellum, 10mm Auto, .38 Super, .45 ACP)
- Colt Double Eagle Officer (US – Semi-Automatic Pistol – .40 S&W, .45 ACP)
- Colt Mustang(US – Subcompact Semi-Automatic Pistol – .380 ACP)
- Colt Mustang Plus II(US – Subcompact Semi-Automatic Pistol – .380 ACP)
- Colt Mustang Pocketlite(US – Subcompact Semi-Automatic Pistol – .380 ACP)
- Colt Mustang XSP(US – Subcompact Semi-Automatic Pistol – .380 ACP)
- Colt OHWS(US – Semi-Automatic Pistol – .45 ACP)
- Colt Pocket 9(US – Subcompact Semi-Automatic Pistol – 9×19mm Parabellum)
  - Revolvers
- Colt 1836 Paterson (US – Single-Action Revolver – .36–.380-inch Revolver Ball)
- Colt 1847 Walker (US – Single-Action Revolver – .44 Revolver Ball)
- Colt 1851 Navy (US – Single-Action Revolver – .38 Centerfire, .38 Rimfire)
- Colt Dragoon (US – Single-Action Revolver – .44 Revolver Ball)
- Colt Baby Dragoon(US – Single-Action Revolver – .44 Revolver Ball)
- Colt M1855 Pocket Revolver (US – Single-Action Revolver – .28 Revolver Ball, .31 Revolver Ball)
- Colt M1855 Pocket Revolver Model 1 (US – Single-Action Revolver – .28 Revolver Ball, .31 Revolver Ball)
- Colt M1855 Pocket Revolver Model 1A (US – Single-Action Revolver – .28 Revolver Ball, .31 Revolver Ball)
- Colt M1855 Pocket Revolver Model 2 (US – Single-Action Revolver – .28 Revolver Ball, .31 Revolver Ball)
- Colt M1860 Army(US – Single-Action Revolver – .44 Revolver Ball)
- Colt M1861 Navy(US – Single-Action Revolver – .38 Short Colt)
- Colt M1873 Single Action Army (US – Single-Action Revolver – .45 Colt)
- Colt Bisley(US – Single-Action Revolver – .45 Colt)
- Colt Buntline Special(US – Edward Zane Carroll Judson, Sr. – 1876 – Single-Action Revolver – .45 Colt: Variant of the Colt Single Action Army. Features a longer 12-inch barrel.)
- Colt Buntline Special Second Generation(US – Colt's Manufacturing Company – 1957 – Single-Action Revolver – .45 Colt: Second generation variant of the Colt Buntline Special. Production began in 1957 and ended in 1974.)
- Colt New Frontier Buntline Special(US – Colt's Manufacturing Company – 1962 – Single-Action Revolver – .45 Colt: Third generation variant of the Colt Buntline Special. Features adjustable sights. Production began in 1962 and ended in 1967.)
- Colt Frontier Sixshooter(US – Single-Action Revolver – .44-40 Winchester)
- Colt New Frontier(US – Single-Action Revolver – .44-40 Winchester)
- Colt Peacemaker(US – Single-Action Revolver – .45 Colt)
- Colt M1877 (US – Double-Action Revolver)
- Colt M1877 Lightning Double Action (US – Double-Action Revolver – .38 Long Colt)
- Colt M1877 Rainmaker Double Action (US – Double-Action Revolver – .32 Colt)
- Colt M1877 Thunderer Double Action(US – Double-Action Revolver – .41 Long Colt)
- Colt M1878 Frontier Double Action (US – Double-Action Revolver – .32-20 WCF, .38–40 WCF, .38 Colt, .41 Colt, .44-40 WCF, .45 Colt, .455 Webley, .476 Eley)
- Colt M1889(US – Double-Action Revolver – .38 Long Colt, .38 Short Colt, .41 Long Colt)
- Colt M1892 (US – Double-Action Revolver – .38 Long Colt, .41 Long Colt)
- Colt M1905 New Marine(US – Double-Action Revolver – .38 Long Colt)
- Colt New Service(US – Double-Action Revolver – .38 Special, .357 Magnum, .38–40, .44 Special, .44-40, .45 Colt, .45 ACP, & .455 Eley)
- Colt M1909 (US – Double-Action Revolver – .45 Colt)
- Colt M1917 (US – Double-Action Revolver – .45 ACP)
- Colt New Service Target(US – Double-Action Revolver – .44 Special, .45 Colt, & .45 ACP)
- Colt Shooting Master(US – Double-Action Revolver – .38 Special, .357 Magnum, .44 Special, .45 Colt, & .45 ACP)
- Colt Police Positive(US – Double-Action Revolver – .32 Colt New Police, .32 Long Colt, .32 Short Colt, .38 Colt New Police)
- Colt Police Positive Target(US – Double-Action Revolver – .22 LR, .22 WRF, .32 Colt New Police, .32 Long Colt, .32 Short Colt)
- Colt Bankers Special(US – Double-Action Revolver – .32-20 Winchester, .38 Special)
- Colt Police Positive Special (US – Double-Action Revolver – .32-20 WCF,.38 Special)
- Colt Detective Special (US – Double-Action Revolver – .22 LR, .32 Colt New Police, .38 Special)
- Colt Cobra (US – Double-Action Revolver – .22 LR, .32 Colt New Police, .38 Special)
- Colt Agent (US – Double-Action Revolver – .38 Special)
- Colt Commando (US – Double-Action Revolver – .38 Special)
- Colt SF-VI(US – Double-Action Revolver – .38 Special)
- Colt DS-II (US – Double-Action Revolver – .38 Special)
- Colt Magnum Carry (US – Double-Action Revolver – .357 Magnum)
- Colt Survivor (US – Double-Action Revolver)
- Colt Diamondback(US – Double-Action Revolver – .22 LR & .38 Special)
- Colt Viper (US – Double-Action Revolver – .38 Special)
- Colt Official Police(US – Double-Action Revolver – .22 LR, .38 S&W, .38 Special, .41 Long Colt)
- Colt Official Police Commando (US – Double-Action Revolver – .38 Special)
- Colt Official Police Marshall (US – Double-Action Revolver – .22 LR & .38 Special)
- Colt Python(US – Double-Action Revolver – .357 Magnum)
- Colt Python Hunter(US – Double-Action Revolver – .357 Magnum)
- Colt Python Silhouette(US – Double-Action Revolver – .357 Magnum)
- Colt Python Target(US – Double-Action Revolver – .38 Special)
- Colt Trooper Mk III (US – Double-Action Revolver – .22 LR, .22 Magnum, & .357 Magnum)
- Colt Border Patrol(US – Double-Action Revolver – .357 Magnum)
- Colt Lawman Mk III (US – Double-Action Revolver – .357 Magnum)
- Colt Metropolitan Mk III(US – Double-Action Revolver – .38 Special)
- Colt Trooper Mk V (US – Double-Action Revolver – .357 Magnum)
- Colt Lawman Mk V (US – Double-Action Revolver – .357 Magnum)
- Colt Boa(US – Double-Action Revolver – .357 Magnum)
- Colt Peacekeeper(US – Double-Action Revolver – .357 Magnum)
- Colt King Cobra(US – Double-Action Revolver – .357 Magnum, .38 Special)
- Colt Anaconda(US – Double-Action Revolver – .44 Magnum, .45 Colt)
  - Rifles
- Colt 57 (US – Bolt-Action Rifle – .243 Winchester, .30–'06)
- Colt Lightning Carbine (US – Lever-Action Rifle – .22 Long, .22 Short, .32-20 Winchester, .38–40 Winchester, .38–55 Winchester, .44-40, .50–95)
- Colt ACC-M (US – Carbine – .223 Remington, 5.56×45mm NATO)
- Colt Accurized Rifle (US – Semi-Automatic Sniper Rifle – .223 Remington, 5.56×45mm NATO)
- Colt ACR (US – Assault Rifle – 5.56×45mm NATO)
- Colt AR-15 SP1 (US – Semi-Automatic Rifle – 5.56×45mm NATO)
- Colt AR-15 A2 Carbine (US – Semi-Automatic Carbine – 5.56×45mm NATO)
- Colt CM901 (US – Assault Rifle – 5.56×45mm NATO, 6.8mm SPC, 7.62×39mm, 7.62×51mm NATO)
- Colt M16 (US – Assault Rifle – 5.56×45mm NATO)
- Colt Automatic Rifle (US – Squad Automatic Weapon – 5.56×45mm NATO)
- Colt CAR-15 (US – Carbine – 5.56×45mm NATO)
- Colt CAR-15 Commando (US – Carbine – 5.56×45mm NATO)
- Colt GAU-5/A (US – Carbine – 5.56×45mm NATO)
- Colt GUU-5/P (US – Carbine – 5.56×45mm NATO)
- Colt CAR-15 Heavy Assault Rifle (US – Squad Automatic Weapon – 5.56×45mm NATO)
- Colt Heavy Assault Rifle M1 (US – Squad Automatic Weapon – 5.56×45mm NATO)
- Colt Model 606A (US – Squad Automatic Weapon – 5.56×45mm NATO)
- Colt Model 606B (US – Squad Automatic Weapon – 5.56×45mm NATO)
- Colt Heavy Assault Rifle M2(US – Squad Automatic Weapon – 5.56×45mm NATO: Prototype)
- Colt CAR-15 Submachine Gun(US – Carbine – 5.56×45mm NATO)
- Colt CAR-15 Survival Rifle(US – Carbine – 5.56×45mm NATO)
- Colt Model 605(US – Carbine – 5.56×45mm NATO)
- Colt Model 605A (US – Carbine – 5.56×45mm NATO)
- Colt Model 605B (US – Carbine – 5.56×45mm NATO)
- Colt M16 HBAR (US – Squad Automatic Weapon – 5.56×45mm NATO)
- Colt M16A1(US – Assault Rifle – 5.56×45mm NATO)
- Colt Mk 4 Mod 0 (US – Integrally Suppressed Assault Rifle – 5.56×45mm NATO)
- Colt Model 635 (US – Carbine – 5.56×45mm NATO)
- Colt XM16E1 (US – Assault Rifle – 5.56×45mm NATO: Prototype)
- Colt M16A2 (US – Assault Rifle – 5.56×45mm NATO)
- Colt M16A3 (US – Assault Rifle – 5.56×45mm NATO)
- Colt M16A4 (US – Assault Rifle – 5.56×45mm NATO)
- Colt M231 FPW (US – Firing Port Weapon – 5.56×45mm NATO)
- Colt Mk 12 Mod 0 (US – Designated Marksman Rifle – 5.56×45mm NATO)
- Colt Model 601 (US – Assault Rifle – 5.56×45mm NATO: Prototype)
- Colt Model 602 (US – Assault Rifle – 5.56×45mm NATO: Prototype)
- Colt Model 635 (US – Submachine Gun – 9×19mm Parabellum)
- Colt Model 655 (US – Designated Marksman Rifle – 5.56×45mm NATO: Prototype)
- Colt Model 656 (US – Designated Marksman Rifle – 5.56×45mm NATO: Prototype)
- Colt M4 (US – Carbine – 5.56×45mm NATO)
- Colt Enhanced M4 (US – Carbine – 5.56×45mm NATO)
- Colt M4A1(US – Carbine – 5.56×45mm NATO)
- Colt M4A2(US – Carbine – 5.56×45mm NATO)
- Colt M4 MWS (US – Carbine – 5.56×45mm NATO)
- Colt Mk 18 Mod 0 (US – Carbine – 5.56×45mm NATO)
- Combined Service Forces 205th Armory
  - Machine Guns
- T57 Machine Gun(Taiwan – General-Purpose Machine Gun – 7.62×51mm NATO)
- T74 Machine Gun(Taiwan – General-Purpose Machine Gun – 7.62×51mm NATO: Licensed Production FN MAG)
    - T75 Light Machine Gun (Taiwan – Light Machine Gun – 5.56×45mm NATO)
- T90 Machine Gun (Taiwan – Heavy Machine Gun – .50 BMG)
  - Pistols
- T75 Pistol (Taiwan – Semi-Automatic Pistol – 9×19mm Parabellum)
- T75K1 (Taiwan – Semi-Automatic Pistol – 9×19mm Parabellum, .45 ACP)
- T75K2(Taiwan – Semi Automatic Pistol 9×19mm Parabellum)
- T97 (Taiwan – Semi-Automatic Pistol – 9×19mm Parabellum)
  - Rifles
- T57 Battle Rifle (Taiwan – Battle Rifle – 7.62×51mm NATO)
- T65 (Taiwan – Assault Rifle – 5.56×45mm NATO)
- T65K1 (Taiwan – Assault Rifle – 5.56×45mm NATO)
- T65K2(Taiwan – Assault Rifle – 5.56×45mm NATO)
- T65K2 Carbine(Taiwan – Carbine – 5.56×45mm NATO)
- T65K3 (Taiwan – Assault Rifle – 5.56×45mm NATO)
- T86 Assault Rifle (Taiwan – Carbine – 5.56×45mm NATO)
- T91 Assault Rifle (Taiwan – Carbine – 5.56×45mm NATO)
- T93 Sniper Rifle(Taiwan – Bolt-Action Sniper Rifle – 7.62×51mm NATO)
  - Submachine Guns
- T77 (Taiwan – Submachine Gun – 9×19mm Parabellum)
- T77A1 (Taiwan – Submachine Gun – 9×19mm Parabellum)
- Companhia de Explosivos de Valparaiba
  - Submachine Guns
- CEV BSM/9 M1(Brazil – Submachine Gun – 9×19mm Parabellum, .45 ACP)
- CEV BSM/9 M2 (Brazil – Submachine Gun – 9×19mm Parabellum, .45 ACP)
- CEV BSM/9 M3 (Brazil – Submachine Gun – 9×19mm Parabellum, .45 ACP)
- CEV M9M1 (Brazil – Submachine Gun – 9×19mm Parabellum, .45 ACP)
- Competition Shooting Sports 6.5 CSS (US – Semi-Automatic Rifle – 6.5mm Grendel)
- Cook submachine gun (US – Submachine Gun – .45 ACP :Prototype)
- Coonan Arms
- Coonan Model A (US – Semi-Automatic Pistol – .357 Magnum)
- Coonan Model B (US – Semi-Automatic Pistol – .357 Magnum)
- COP 357 (US – Double-Action Derringer Pistol – .357 Magnum .38 Special)
- Cristobal Automatic Rifle (Dominican Republic – Battle Rifle – 7.62×51mm NATO)
- Crossfire Mk 1 (US – Pump-Action Rifle, Pump-Action Shotgun – 5.56×45mm NATO, 12 Gauge)

== See also ==
- List of firearms by era
  - List of pre-20th century firearms
  - List of World War II firearms
- List of firearms by country
  - List of modern Russian small arms
- Lists of firearms by actions
  - List of blow-forward firearms
  - List of delayed-blowback firearms
- List of firearms by type
  - List of assault rifles
  - List of battle rifles
  - List of carbines
  - List of firearm brands
  - List of flamethrowers
  - List of machine guns
  - List of multiple-barrel firearms
  - List of pistols
  - List of shotguns
  - List of sniper rifles
  - List of submachine guns
- List of firearm cartridges
  - List of handgun cartridges
  - List of rifle cartridges
- List of semi-automatic firearms
  - List of semi-automatic pistols
  - List of semi-automatic rifles
  - List of semi-automatic shotguns
  - List of most-produced firearms
