= T90 (disambiguation) =

The T-90 is a Russian main battle tank.

T90 or T-90 may also refer to:

== Automobiles ==
- Cooper T90, a British Formula 5000 racing car
- Darrian T90, a British grand tourer racing car
- Jiefang T90, a Chinese pickup truck
- Lola T90, a British Indycar racing car
- Maxus T90, a Chinese pickup truck
- Suzuki T90, a Japanese motorcycle
- Venucia T90, a Chinese crossover
- Bestune T90, a Chinese mid-size crossover

== Military ==
- HMS Moonstone (T90), an armed trawler of the Royal Navy
- Type 90 machine gun
- Type 90 tank, Japanese main battle tank
- T-90 self-propelled anti-aircraft gun, based on the Soviet T-70

== Other uses ==
- Canon T90, an SLR film camera
- Cray T90, a supercomputer
- Chambers County-Winnie Stowell Airport, in Chambers County, Texas, United States
- Nike Total 90, a sportswear brand
