= M100 =

M100 or M-100 may refer to:

Aviation

- M-100 (rocket), a two-stage Soviet sounding rocket
- Miles Student (M.100), a lightweight trainer aircraft
- Mitsubishi SpaceJet M100, a regional jet aircraft
- DJI Matrice 100, a Chinese industrial drone
- Klimov M-100, a Soviet version of the Hispano-Suiza 12Y aeroengine

Computing

- TRS-80 Model 100, an early portable computer
- Palm m100 series, a popular lower cost version of the Palm Pilot

Road and Rail

- M-100 (Michigan highway), a north–south state trunkline highway in the U.S. state of Michigan
- M100 (Cape Town), a metropolitan route near Cape Town, South Africa
- M100 (New York City bus), a New York City Bus route in Manhattan
- M100, the second version of the Jeep trailer
- Effa M100, the Brazilian name for the Changhe Ideal automobile
- M100 Elan, a model of the Lotus Elan automobile
- Mercedes-Benz M100 engine, a 6.3/6.9 liter SOHC V8 automobile engine
- HKL Class M100, a metro train of Helsinki Metro

Other

- M-100 (explosive), a pyrotechnic device
- M100, the magnetoencephalographic equivalent to the N100 large, negative-going evoked potential measured by electroencephalography
- Messier 100, a grand design spiral galaxy
- Calico M100, a novel .22 caliber semi-automatic carbine
- Canon EOS M100, an mirrorless camera from Canon
- Masters athletics, an age group for athletes aged 35+
