= Colt Delta Elite =

Delta Elite
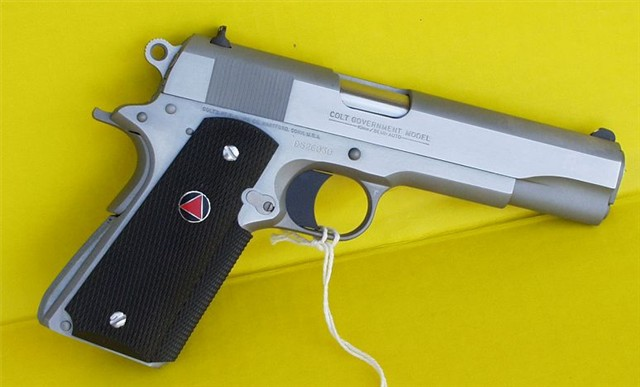
- Colt Delta Elite
- Type: Semi-automatic pistol
- Place of origin: United States

Production history
- Designer: Colt's Manufacturing Company based on a John Browning design
- Designed: 1987
- Produced: First Generation: 1987–1996; Second Generation: 2009-Present
- No. built: Unknown
- Variants: Blued, Stainless, Enhanced, 10/40, Bright Stainless

Specifications
- Mass: 2.4 lb (1,105 g) empty, w/ magazine
- Length: 8.25 in (210 mm)
- Barrel length: 5.03 in (127 mm)
- Cartridge: 10mm Auto
- Action: Single action, Short recoil operated
- Rate of fire: Semi-automatic
- Muzzle velocity: 1329 ft/s (405 m/s)
- Effective firing range: 109 yd (100 m)
- Feed system: 8+1 detachable-box magazine
- Sights: Fixed iron

The Colt Delta Elite is a modified series 80 M1911 pistol chambered for the 10mm Auto cartridge. It was first introduced in 1987 by the Colt's Manufacturing Company.

The Delta Elite is credited as being the first firearm produced by a major manufacturer to chamber the 10mm.

== History ==
The 10mm round was introduced in 1983 along with the first pistol in 10mm, the Bren Ten, which came from smaller manufacturer Dornaus & Dixon, who only manufactured 1,500 pistols from 1983 to 1986 when the company went bankrupt. The Colt Delta Elite was released in 1987 and was the second commercial pistol, and the first from a major manufacturer, chambered in the 10mm cartridge. After Dornaus & Dixon bankruptcy, the Colt Delta Elite was the only commercially available 10mm pistol until the Smith & Wesson 1006 was released in 1990. Due to the 1986 FBI Miami Shootout and the 1984-1990 television series Miami Vice, where one of the lead protagonists had used a 10mm pistol as his primary signature weapon, demand for the caliber, especially with outdoorsmen and as a defense round, increased. Had it not been for Colt's Patent Fire Arms Manufacturing Company making the unexpected decision in 1987 to bring out their Delta Elite pistol, the 10mm Auto might have sunk into obsolescence, becoming an obscure footnote in firearms history.

=== Generation 1 (1987–1996) ===
The Delta Elite is a standard M1911 design, with a few minor differences from the latest Series 80 derivative of that pistol. It carried the rowel "Commander" type hammer of that pistol and the same overall features of the 1911 that have made it so popular with users. However, the Delta Elite carries a stiffer double recoil spring to handle the increased recoil of the 10mm round. Unlike the .400 Corbon, the 10mm can easily exceed the pressure levels of the .357 Magnum, thus stressing the original design's limitations, unless care is given. Many gunsmiths have their own modifications which they feel adjust the level of felt recoil of the Delta Elite. Some of the early 1987-era Delta Elites had a tendency to suffer flex-induced slide rail stress cracks and this was quickly addressed by removing the section of the rail above the slide-stop cutout.

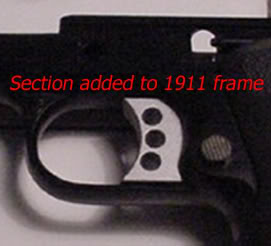
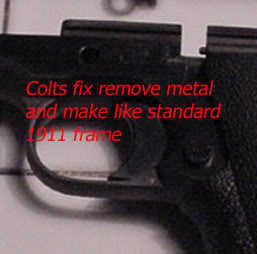

=== Shifting Market Demands and End of Production (1996) ===
The 10mm Auto round is a longer round, which results in a larger frame that isn't comfortable for users with smaller hands - a key issue that contributed to the FBI's switch from 10mm to 40S&W. The FBI, not requiring the full load of 10mm ammunition, found that a downsized 10mm would meet their FBI velocity specification and could fit into a medium frame handgun. Notably, the Unit Chief of the FBI Firearms Training Unit, John Hall, supplied his own Colt Delta Elite and personally hand-loaded ammunition for the tests that highlighted there was a lot of air space in the 10mm round when not fully loaded with gunpowder (meaning the case could be shortened). The 40 S&W debuted in 1990 and uses the same bore diameter and case head as the 10mm Auto, but uses a shorter case to be more compatible to weapons built for the 9x19 Parabellum (9mm) frames. The popularity of the 40 S&W accelerated after the 1994 Assault Weapons Ban prohibited ammunition magazines in excess of 10 rounds (consumers then chose more powerful 40S&W over the 9mm since they were then limited to 10 rounds) and with the FBI adopting the 40S&W in 1997. This demand for a shortened 10mm Auto round, the 40 S&W, removed a lot of demand and attention from the 10mm Auto. The pistol was dropped from production in 1996 due to lackluster sales and the availability of similar powered pistols in smaller framed pistols chambered in .40 S&W.

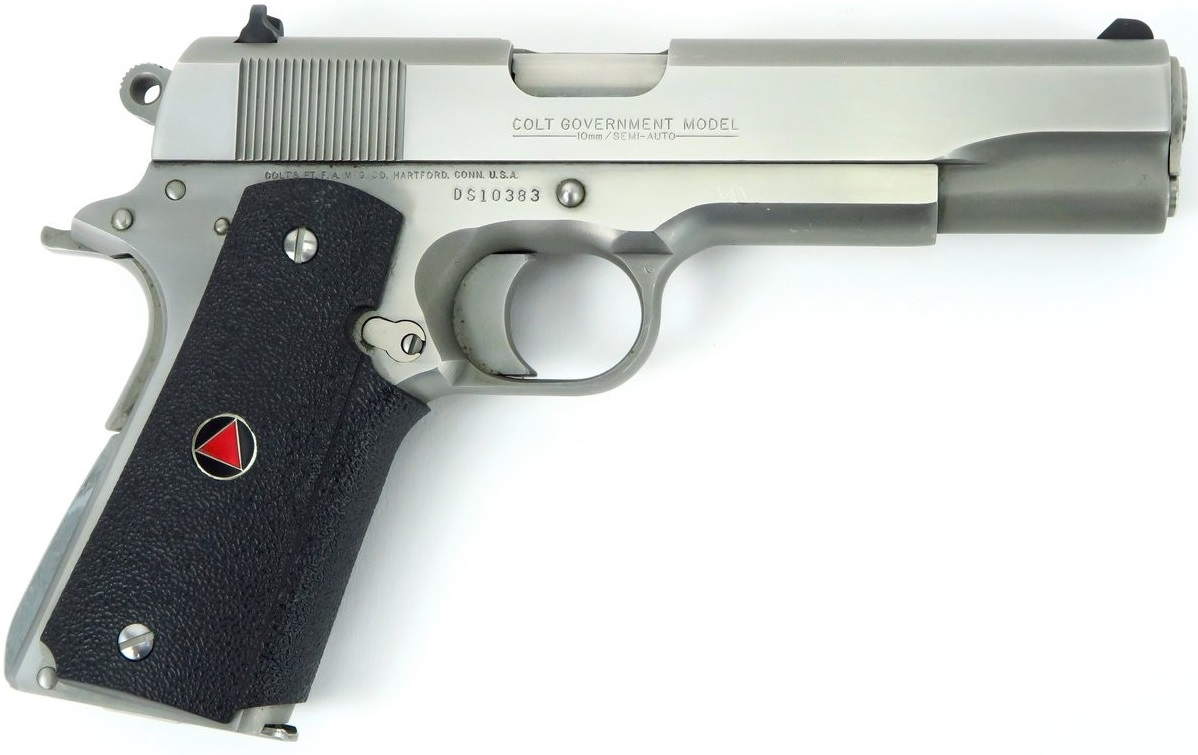
Colt Delta Elite O2020 (First Generation 1987–2005)

=== Generation 2 (2009–2015) ===
Colt announced the reintroduction of the Delta Elite at the 2008 SHOT Show. The 2009-version is generally similar to the 1987-version, except for the use of carbon steel versus stainless and the use of heavier recoil springs. The 2009-version Delta Elites were manufactured with the traditional barrel/bushing arrangement, consistent with the 1987-version, even though they were initially announced at the 2008 SHOT show to have the "bull" bushingless barrel setup. Colt Customer Service stated they had a lack of acceptable accuracy problem with the announced barrel setup and that was the cause of the delay in the Delta Elite's production schedule. The new Delta Elite pistol was released March 31, 2009.

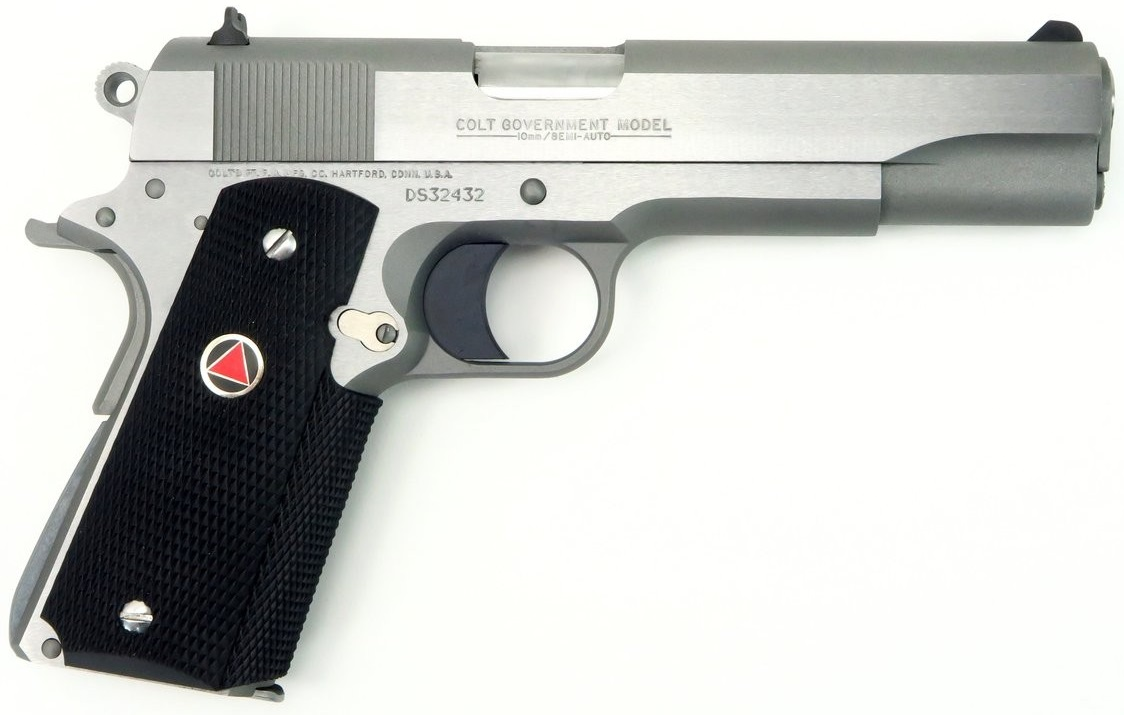
Colt Delta Elite O2020 (Second Generation 2009–2015)

=== Generation 2.5 (since 2016) ===
Colt introduced upgrades at the 2016 NRA Show to the 2009-era Delta Elite product line, including; Novak sights, undercut trigger guard, dual spring recoil spring assembly, high ride upswept full-width beavertail grip safety with palm swell, composite stocks (compared to the wrap around rubber grips dating back to the original 1980s version), lightened three-hole aluminum trigger, speed skeletonized hammer, extended thumb safety, tighter tolerances, no full-length recoil spring guide so it breaks down without tools, Delta triangle does not have "10mm" marking inside (nor does it have "10mm" anywhere on the slide), and new angled cocking serrations on the rear on the slide only. The Colt Delta Elite O2020 model stopped production and it is now sold as the O2020XE to distinguish the post-2016 upgraded model.

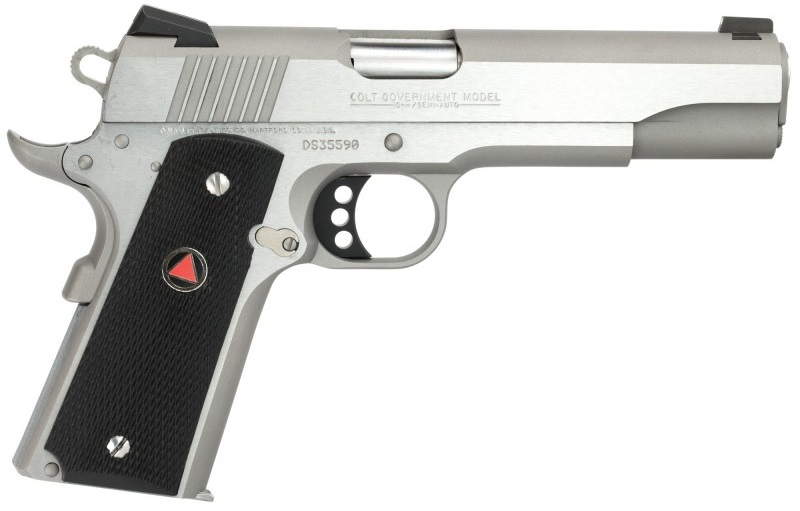
Colt Delta Elite O2020XE (Second Generation 2016-present)

== Generation 1 Variants (1987–1996) ==
Original release of Colt Delta Elite featuring pebbled texture wrap-around rubber grips and a solid silver aluminum trigger.

- O2010 - Colt Delta Elite - Blue (B) - Has a "DE" serial number prefix.
- O2020 - Colt Delta Elite - Stainless (STS) - Has a "DS" serial number prefix.
- O2021 - Colt Delta Elite - Bright Stainless (BSTS)
- O2010MT - Match Ten - This special edition included a government model slide and barrel assembly, a 10mm Gold Cup receiver assembly, a special rollmark "Match 10" on the left slide, and an extra magazine. It has blue finish with orange ramp front and white outline Millett High Profile Adjustable Sites with standard wrap around rubber grips. According to Colt, only 400 were manufactured in 1988, with a serial number range for this edition is MTEN001 through MTEN400. The Gold Cup versions were not available at the time, so this was the most advanced 'Gold Cup' type available with upgraded trigger and target sights. The adjustable Millet style sight allows it to be centered for decent groups at 25 yards.
- O2010CTE - Delta Elite Custom Edition - 5 Inch, Blue Slide, Hard Chrome Frame. Made in 1988 with only 400 produced
- O5010 - Colt Delta Gold Cup - Stainless (STS) - The Colt Delta Gold Cup National Match was Colt's top-of-the-line competition/target 10mm pistol. Colt produced this variation of the Delta Elite for 5 years from 1989 to 1993, but the total production figures were very low for this variation. Each pistol was built from the best match-quality parts Colt could build or source, and each pistol was hand-fit to be as tight and accurate as possible. The stainless steel Delta Gold Cup also features a target-style "Accro" adjustable rear sight and a serrated adjustable target trigger. The grips are wraparound textured black rubber combat grips with inset black, red, and gold Colt "Delta" symbol medallions.
- ^{model#?} - Colt Gold Cup Ten - Assembled by Colt Custom Shop with only 500 being produced. Serial Numbers begin GCTEN ending with numerals from 001 to 500.
- O8046 - Colt Elite Ten/Forty - A special edition for Lew Horton Co. in the early 1990s. This edition is a special dual caliber offering of the Combat Elite semi-automatic pistol. The pistol is furnished in .40 S&W and includes a 10mm Auto conversion kit consisting of a barrel slide stop, two recoil springs and guide, and a stainless steel 10mm magazine. In addition, each pistol is specially roll-marked "ELITE TEN/FORTY" on the left side of the slide and features a flat mainspring housing. Finish is B/STS, with a blued slide and stainless frame. This edition consists of approximately 411 units and utilizes a special serial number prefix 1040E.
- ^{model#? - model name?} – spur hammer with black grips

== Generation 2 Variants (2009–2015) ==
In 2009, Colt re-released the Colt Delta Elite with diamond texture wrap-around grips, updated recoil spring and guide rod.

- O2020 - Colt Delta Elite Stainless
- O2020WG - Colt Delta Elite Wood Grips - In 2015, a version with wood grips and serrated front strap was introduced.
- O2020Z - In 2016, a small run of two-tone blued slide/ stainless steel frame O2020s was manufactured for distribution by Bill Hicks (box marked O2020 but sometimes referred to as O2020Z).

== Generation 2.5 Variants (since 2016) ==
In 2016, the Delta Elite was upgraded with Novak sights, composite non-wrap-around grips, extended thumb safety, beavertail grip safety, enhanced hammer, flared ejector port, Gold Cup serrations, and 3 hole trigger.

- O2020XE - Colt Delta Elite Stainless
- O2020FDE - Colt Delta Elite FDE - A FDE cerakote version of this gun was offered by Davidson's.
- O2020RG - Colt Delta Elite Rail Gun
- O2020XETT - Colt Delta Elite Two-Tone
Colt Delta Elite variants
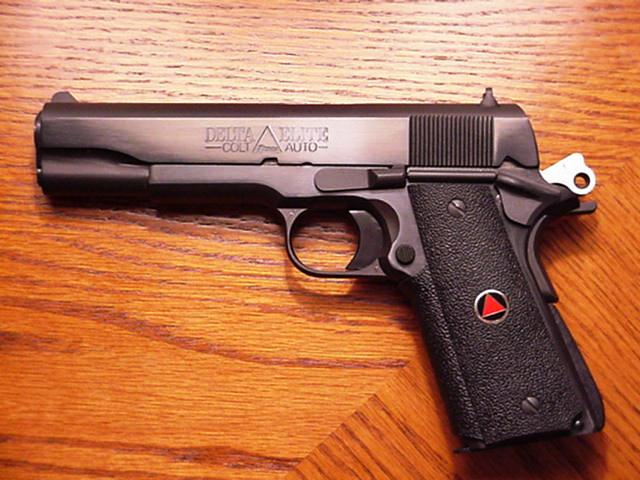
1987 Colt Delta Elite - Blue

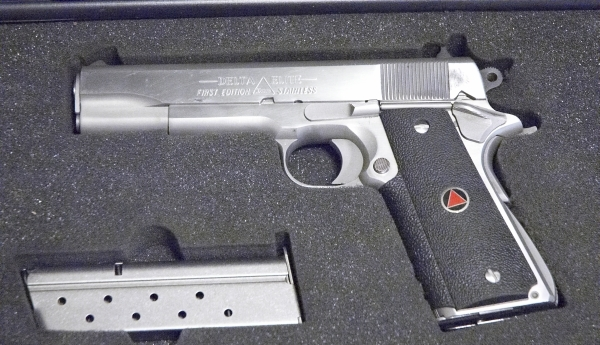
1987 Colt Delta Elite - Stainless

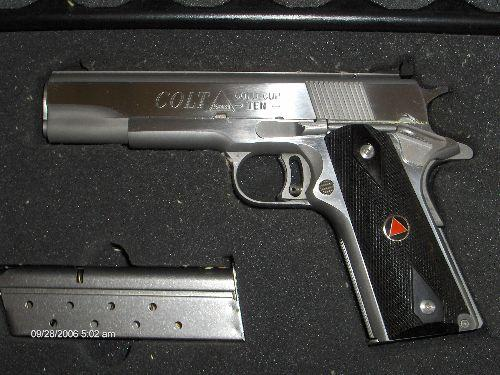
1987 Colt Gold Cup TEN

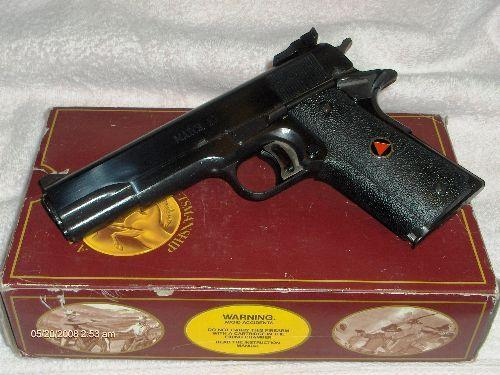
1987 Colt Match 10

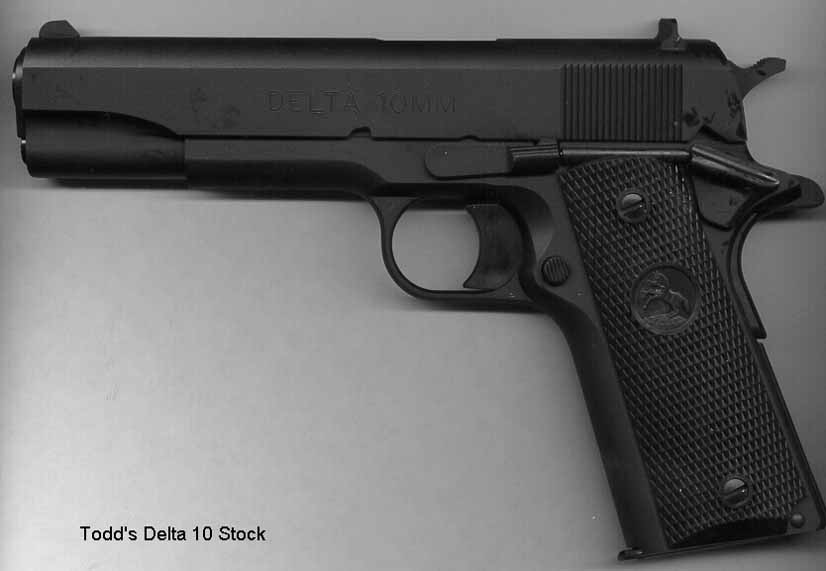
1987 Colt Delta 10MM

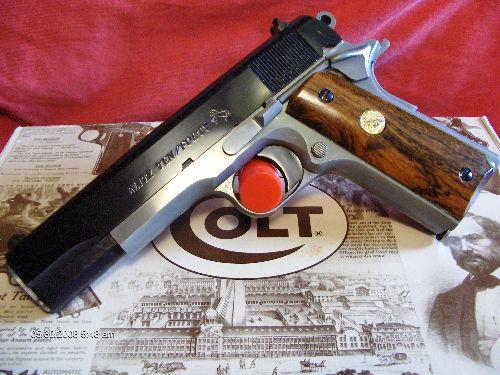
1987 Colt Elite Ten Forty

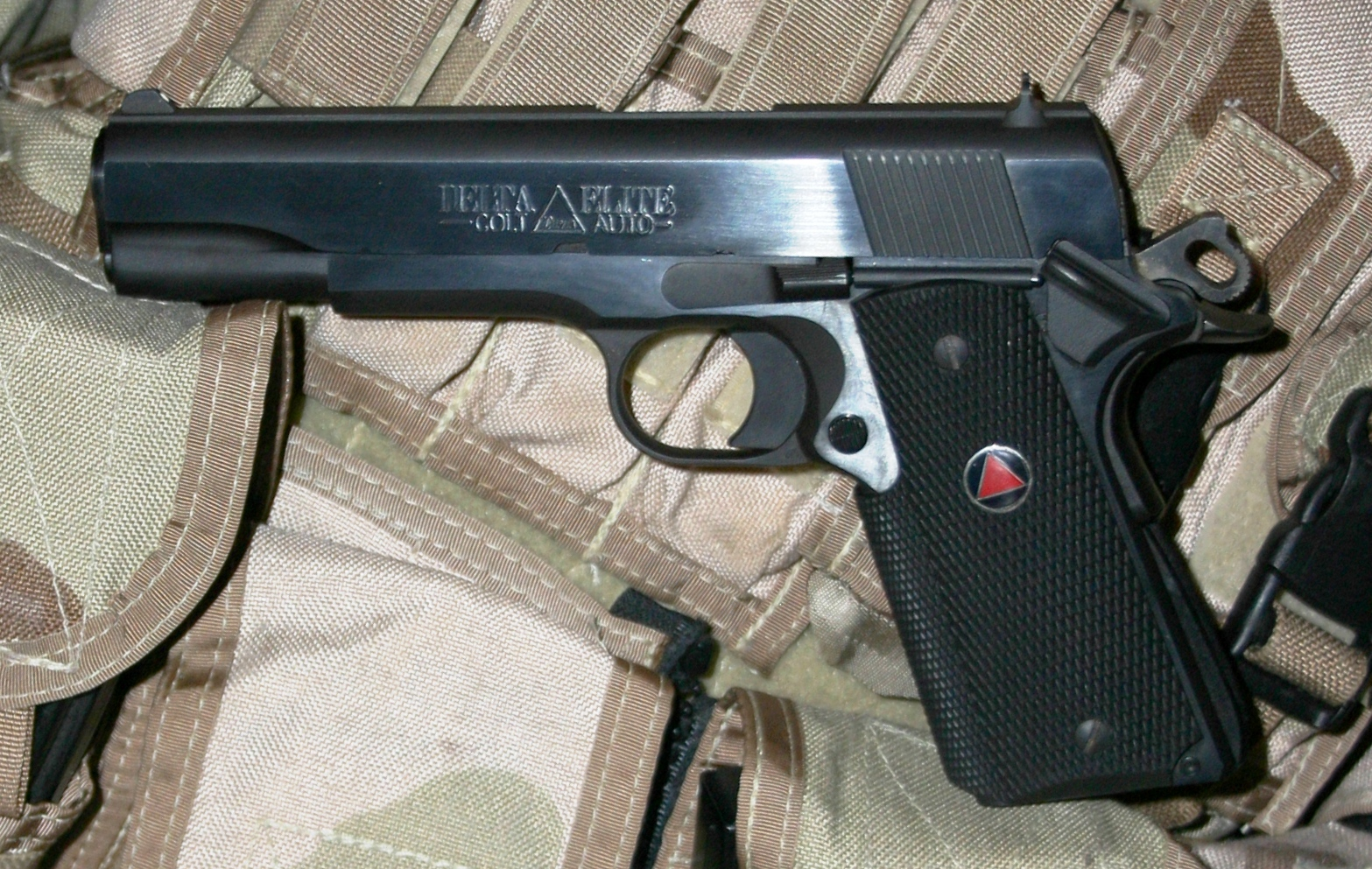
1987 Colt Delta Elite - Blue

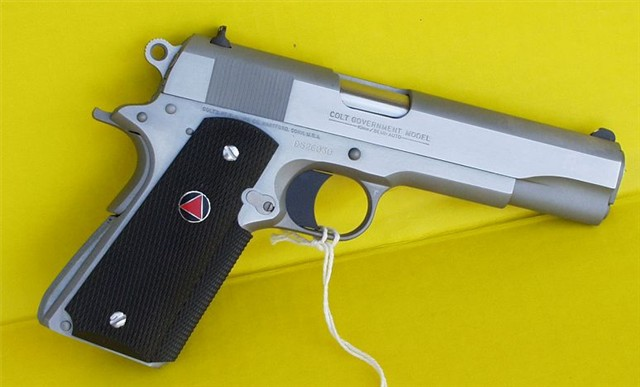
2009 Colt Delta Elite - Stainless

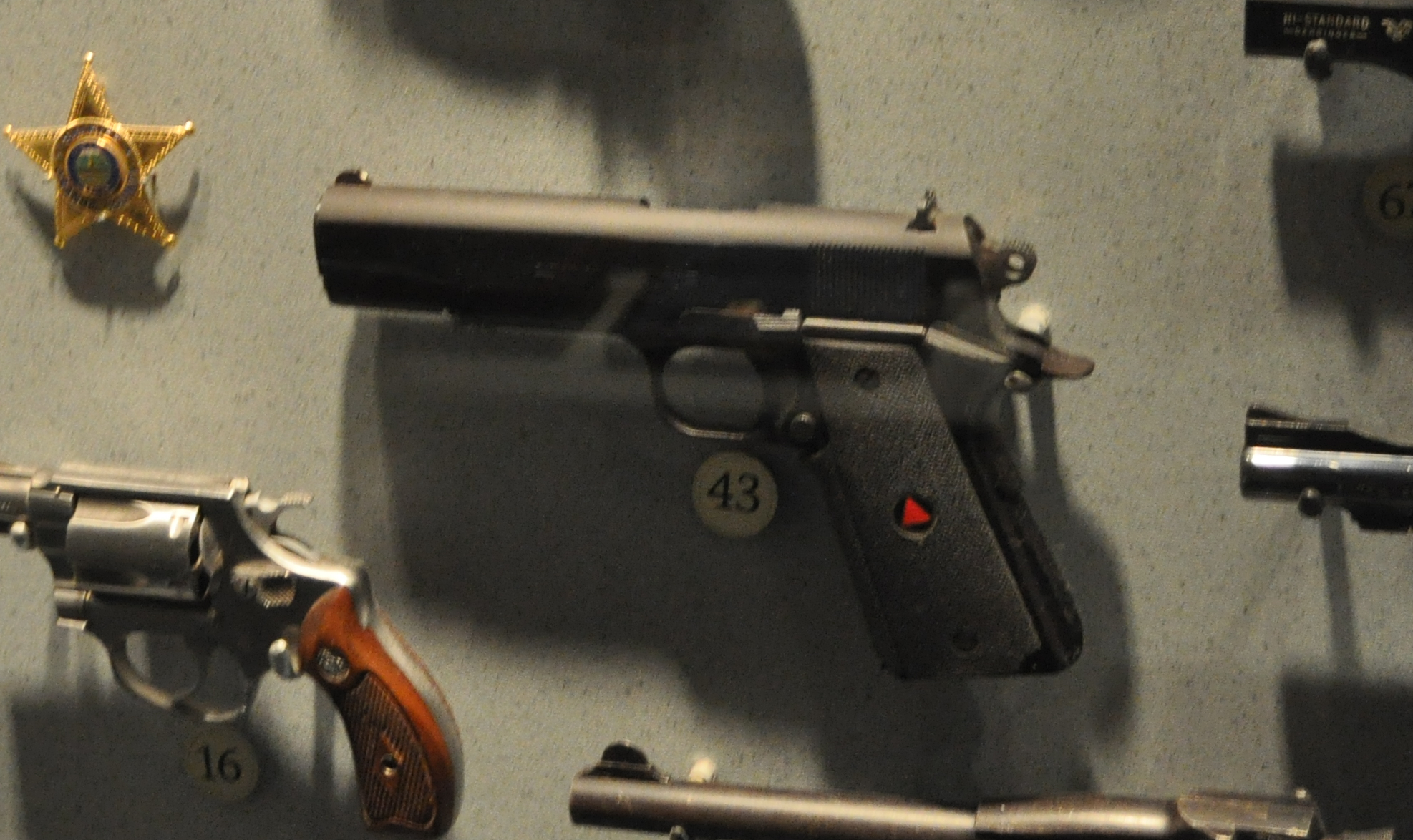
A Delta Elite on display at the National Firearms Museum. Police issue from Hartford, CT

== See also ==
- Glock 20, another relatively successful pistol chambered for 10mm Auto
- Kimber Eclipse, another 1911-style handgun chambered in 10mm Auto
- Tanfoglio Force, a popular Italian-made clone of the CZ-75 chambered in 10mm Auto
- Colt Python, Colt's premium revolver line
