= Colt Mustang =

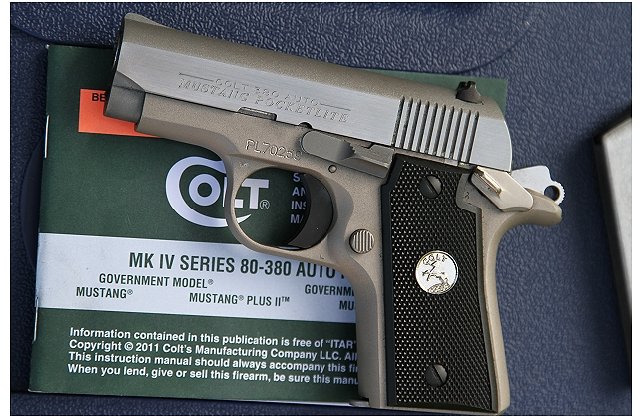
- Colt Mustang Pocket Lite 2012
- Place of origin: United States

Production history
- Designer: Hank Tatro
- Manufacturer: Colt's Manufacturing Company
- Produced: 1983–1996; 2011–present

Specifications
- Mass: 12.5 oz (350 g)
- Length: 5.5 in (140 mm)
- Barrel length: 2.75 in (70 mm)
- Caliber: .380 ACP
- Action: Short recoil operation
- Muzzle velocity: 900 ft/s (274 m/s)
- Feed system: 5 or 6 round box magazine
- Sights: Iron sights

The Colt Mustang is a line of two lightweight, single-action pocket pistols chambered for the .380 ACP cartridge, produced by Colt's Manufacturing Company. The firearm line was produced from 1983 to 1996 as the Colt Mustang and from 2011 to present the Mustang was reintroduced along with an alloy frame model and an updated polymer frame version, the Colt Mustang XSP.

== Brief history ==
In 1983, Colt introduced the Colt Mark IV/ Series 80 Government Model -.380 Auto. This pocket pistol was similar in appearance, but not design, to the Colt M1911. The Government Model .380's obvious aesthetic difference being that it is scaled down to roughly 78 percent to that of a full-sized M1911 Government Model. From the factory the .380 Government Model came with a capacity of 7+1. In 1986, Colt introduced a simplified version of their .380 with a shortened barrel, slide, and gripframe, holding two fewer rounds and sold it as the Mustang. In 1987, the Pocket Light version was introduced boosting the popularity because of the reduced weight of the weapon. In 1988, the Mustang Plus II was introduced and it had the longer gripframe of the original Government Model. The Mustang Plus II derived its name from holding 2 more rounds in its magazine than the original Mustang. In a number of years, Colt changed their spring and follower in the Mustang magazine, increasing its capacity to 6. In 1993, the Night Light .380 was introduced with Bar Dot Tritium night sights. In 1996, Colt added a blued steel frame or stainless version. In 2011, Colt reintroduced the previously discontinued Mustang Pocketlite, along with the Colt Mustang XSP in 2013, a polymer frame version with updated design.

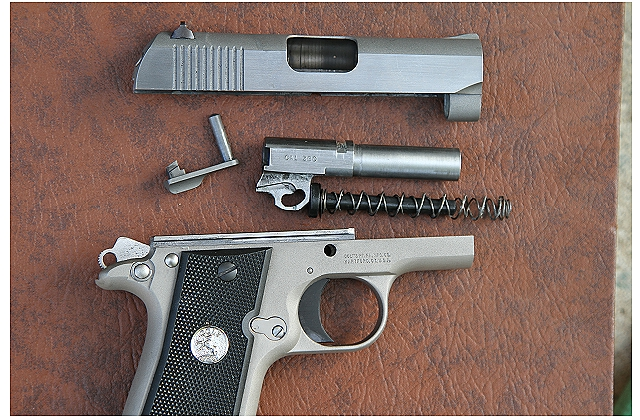
Colt Mustang Pocket Lite disassembled
