= Colt Double Eagle =

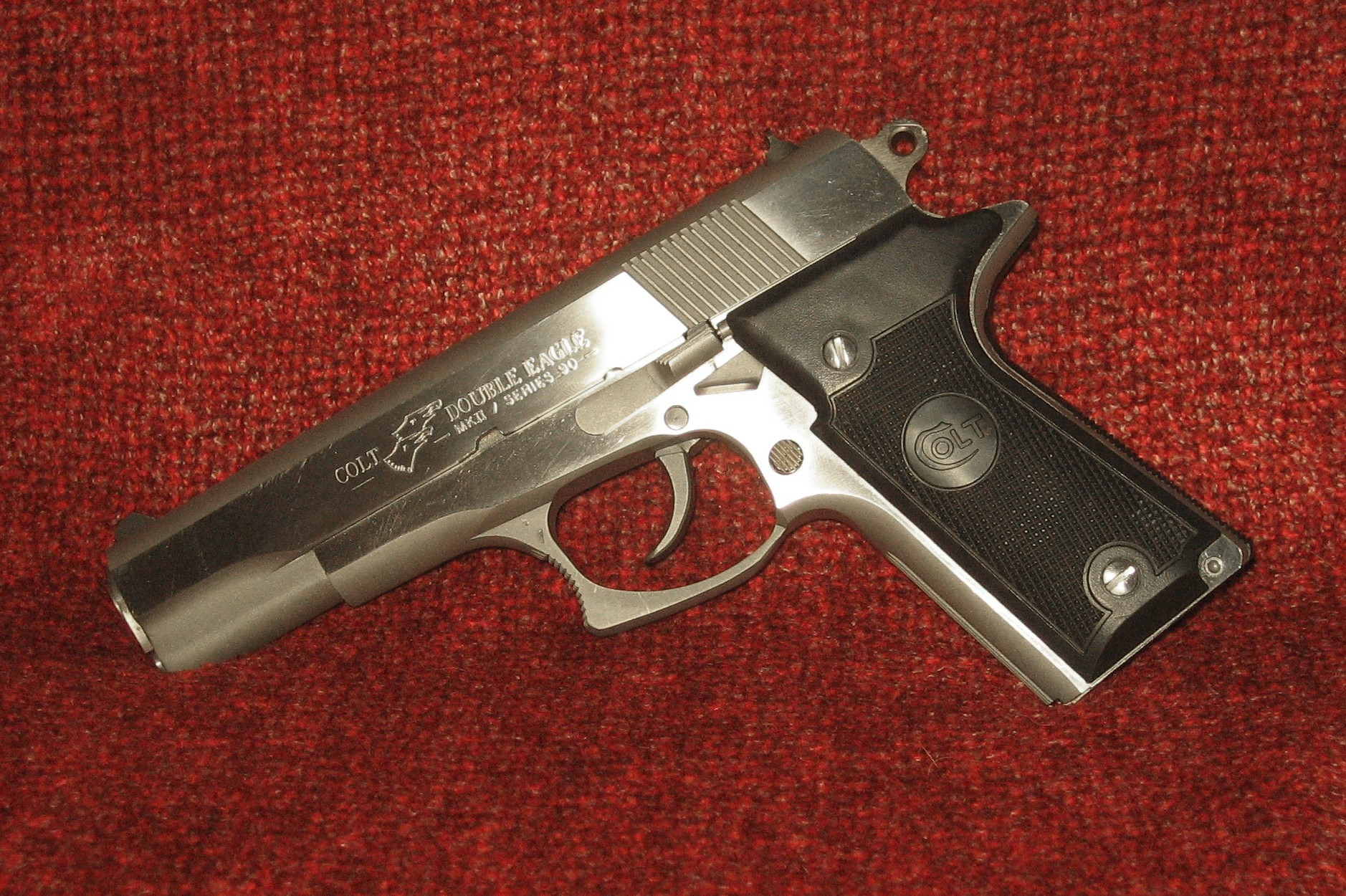
- Full-size Colt Double Eagle Mark II
- Type: Semi-automatic pistol
- Place of origin: United States

Production history
- Designer: Ron Smith
- Designed: 1985
- Manufacturer: Colt's Manufacturing Company
- Produced: 1989–1997
- Variants: 3 (Full-size, Commanders model, and Officers model)

Specifications
- Mass: 42.51 oz (1,205 g)
- Length: 8.5 inches (220 mm)
- Barrel length: 5.0 inches (130 mm)
- Cartridge: .45 ACP; 10mm Auto.40 S&W; 9×19mm Parabellum.38 Super
- Action: Double-action/Single-action
- Muzzle velocity: 850 ft/s (260 m/s) (.45 ACP)
- Effective firing range: 50 yards (46 m)
- Maximum firing range: 100 yards (91 m)
- Feed system: 8-round magazine
- Sights: Iron sights

The Colt Double Eagle was a double-action / single action, semi-automatic pistol manufactured by Colt's Manufacturing Company between 1989 and 1997. It was available in standard full-size, as well as in more compact versions. It featured a decocking lever, and was chambered for several calibers. The family of models was known as the Series 90.

== Design ==
The design of the Double Eagle was based on the Colt M1911 pistol. Magazines are single stack and are identical to magazines shipped with the M1911. Most of the Double Eagle models were available in stainless steel only, however the "Lightweight" Officer's had an alloy frame and blued slide.

Ron Smith of Smith Enterprise, Inc. was the main designer of the double action mechanism.

The slide used a version of Colt's series 80 locking firing pin safety, but unlike Colt's series 80 pistols, the Double Eagle Officer's model in .45 ACP held an 8-round magazine.

== Variants ==
The Double Eagle was chambered for several calibers; among the more common are .45 ACP and 10mm Auto. Occasionally, one will see a copy in .40 S&W, 9×19mm Parabellum, and .38 Super. Similar to the M1911, Colt offered, in addition to the full-sized version, the more compact Commander and Officer versions.

The full-sized version was chambered for .45 ACP and 10mm Auto, as well as in 9mm and .38 Super for a time in 1992. The Commander was chambered for .45 ACP, along with a somewhat rare .40 S&W version in 1992. The Officer's model was available in .45 ACP and rarely .40 S&W, again only in 1992. Colt eventually redesigned the trigger mechanism and added a retaining plate due to some shooters having problems with skin being pinched by the top part of the trigger, as well as some springs only being retained by the grip panel. The result was the Double Eagle Mark II.
