= Cooey Canuck =

- Place of origin: Canada

Production history
- Designer: Herbert William Cooey
- Designed: 1919
- Produced: 1919-1929

Specifications
- Cartridge: .22LR; .25 rimfire cartridge; .410 gauge
- Action: Single-shot Bolt-action

The Cooey Canuck was the first rifle model produced by Canadian arms designer Herbert William Cooey in 1919. It was a single-shot bolt-action rifle chambered in the .22 or .25 rimfire cartridge. Different versions of this rifle were made in Toronto until 1929. The single-shot .22 version of the rifle had a reputation for accuracy and affordability, and won a Certificate of Honour at the British Empire Exhibition in 1924. Cooey also produced a junior and .410 gauge versions of this firearm.

== See also ==
Cooey 60
