= Cooey 84 =

Cooey Model 84/840
- Type: Shotgun
- Place of origin: Canada

Production history
- Designer: Hubert Joseph Cooey
- Designed: 1947
- Manufacturer: H. W. Cooey Machine & Arms Company, later Winchester Arms Company.
- Unit cost: CDN $50-$150
- Produced: 1948-1966 (Model 84),1967-1979 (Model 840)
- No. built: ~ 1,900,000 (Cooey 84/840) 221,578 (Winchester 370) 395,168 (Winchester 37A)
- Variants: Cooey Model 84 & 840, Winchester Model 370 & 37A

Specifications
- Length: 44.5" (28" barrel)
- Barrel length: 26" 28" 30" and 32", 34", 36" (rare) barrel's
- Cartridge: 12, 16, 20, 28 gauge, .410 bore (2 3/4" or 3" chamber)
- Barrels: 1
- Action: single shot, break action
- Rate of fire: Single shot
- Muzzle velocity: depends on cartridge
- Effective firing range: depends on cartridge
- Maximum firing range: depends on cartridge
- Sights: Iron (front bead only)

The Cooey 84 is a shotgun manufactured by the H. W. Cooey Machine & Arms Company in Cobourg, Ontario, Canada (later acquired by the Winchester Arms Company). The shotgun was sold as the Model 84 until 1967 when, following acquisition by Winchester, it was sold as the Model 840 until production ended in 1979. Today, the 84/840 is considered a collector's item to those who collect Canadian-made firearms.

== History ==
The Model 84 was the first shotgun designed and manufactured by the H. W. Cooey Machine & Arms Company in Cobourg, Ontario, Canada. Model 84's manufactured before 1961 are stamped "H. W. Cooey Machine & Arms Company" on the right side of the action, while guns made after the Winchester's acquisition of Cooey are stamped "Winchester-Western (Canada) Limited." on the right side of the receiver. Written records of serial numbers are not generally available. Some have suggested that Cooey did not use serial numbers, but many pre-1961 Model 84s are stamped with serial numbers on the receiver, barrel (under the fore stock) and under the butt plate/shoulder stock. Dating the serial numbers remains a challenge for collectors of Cooey firearms.

The Model 84 was chambered in most common shotgun shells including 12 gauge, 16 gauge, 20 gauge, 28 gauge, and .410 bore. A new owner of a Cooey Model 84 should get the chamber measured for the proper size of shot shell by a professional gunsmith since most of the older 84 series guns were chambered for 2 3/4" shot shells (except .410 bores), while the 840 series was chambered for the larger and more powerful 3" shot shells.

These shotguns commonly had 26", 28" and 30" barrels on them but many other lengths are available, including the rare 32", 34", and 36" barrels. With the 28" barrel the overall length is 44.5" long. The most common choke in an original barrel was full choke, which is great for any purpose when a tight pattern is needed.

== Variants ==
There were not many documents kept on the production history of Cooey firearms, but the Cooey 84 single shot shotgun was introduced in 1948-1967, then 1967-1979 as the model 840 after the Winchester Arms Company purchased Cooey. It is estimated that there were approximately 1,900,000 Cooey model 84/840's made, approximately 221,578 Winchester model 370 (Winchester's upgraded model of the 84) and 395,168 Winchester 37A.
