= Chropi GP10 submachine gun =

Chropi GP10
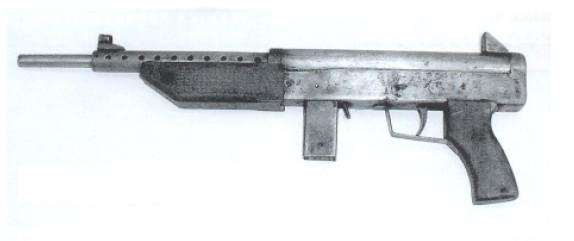
- Chropi GP10 submachine gun (without magazine)
- Type: Submachine gun
- Place of origin: Greece

Service history
- Used by: Hellenic Army (not officially adopted)

Production history
- Designer: Sotiris Sofianopoulos (team leader)
- Designed: 1975
- Manufacturer: Chropi (Chropei), Athens
- No. built: approximately 100

Specifications
- Length: 590 mm
- Barrel length: 335 mm
- Cartridge: .45 ACP; 9×19mm Parabellum
- Action: Blowback
- Feed system: 15- and 30- round magazine
- Sights: Iron

The Chropi GP10 was a submachine gun built by Chropi, Hropi (Greek: ΧΡΩΠΕΙ) a Greek chemicals company, which used the "Chropi" spelling on its weapons. It was designed by a team under Sotiris Sofianopoulos (apparently an original Greek-Cypriot design) and was proposed to the Greek Army in 1975. Initial positive performance results during tests were followed by a final rejection with dire consequences for the company, which had improved its existing infrastructure in order to mass-produce the weapon. About 100 units had been produced, which were delivered to the Greek state and ended up in Greek Army storage facilities.

== Bibliography ==
- Theodoros Dimopoulos (January–February 2006). "Όπλα ελληνικής επινόησης και κατασκευής (Greek developed and produced arms)". Panzer (in Greek) (24).

== External link ==
- L.S. Skartsis, "Modern Greece's Machines: A Comprehensive Guide to Greek Vehicle & Machine Manufacturers (1700 to Present)" (2026) ISBN 978-618-00-6734-7 (eBook)
