= Chropi rifle =

Chropi Rifle
- Type: Assault rifle Squad automatic weapon Designated marksman rifle
- Place of origin: Greece

Service history
- In service: 1976-present
- Used by: Hellenic Army (not officially adopted)

Production history
- Designer: Sotiris Sofianopoulos (team leader)
- Designed: 1975
- Manufacturer: Chropi (Chropei), Athens
- No. built: Exact number unknown, estimated: a few dozen
- Variants: Chropi rifle (5.56x45mm variant 20 round magazine) and (7.62x39mm variant 30 round magazine)

Specifications
- Length: 1,090 mm
- Barrel length: 460 mm
- Cartridge: 5.56×45mm NATO; 7.62×39mm
- Caliber: 5.56mm 7.62mm
- Action: Gas-operated
- Feed system: 30 round detachable box magazine
- Sights: Iron sights

The Chropi Rifle was an assault rifle built by Chropi, Hropi (Greek: ΧΡΩΠΕΙ), a Greek chemicals company, which used the "Chropi" spelling on its weapons. It was designed by a team under Sotiris Sofianopoulos and was proposed to the Greek Army in 1975. It was a simple and rather outdated design, clearly inferior to the Heckler & Koch G3, which was adopted (produced by the state run EVO company). The rifle was rejected after a series of tests indicated that the weapon itself did not adhere to all of the desired standards. The company, nonetheless, had created all necessary infrastructure for the rifle's production and a small number were manufactured and delivered to the Greek Army but these ended up being kept in storage facilities.

== Variants ==
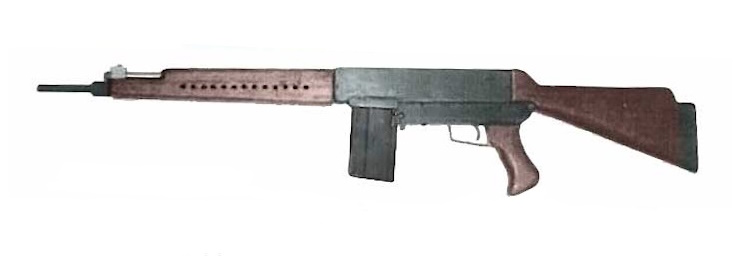
Chropi rifle (5.56x45mm variant 20 round magazine)

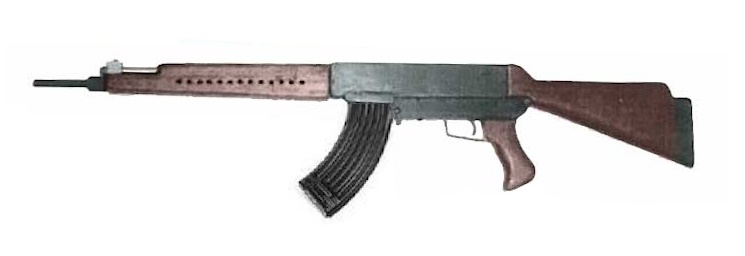
Chropi rifle (7.62x39mm variant 30 round magazine)

== See also ==
- List of assault rifles

== Bibliography ==
- Theodoros Dimopoulos (January–February 2006). "Όπλα ελληνικής επινόησης και κατασκευής (Greek developed and produced arms)". Panzer (in Greek) (24).

== External link ==
- L.S. Skartsis, "Modern Greece's Machines: A Comprehensive Guide to Greek Vehicle & Machine Manufacturers (1700 to Present)" (2026) ISBN 978-618-00-6734-7 (eBook)
