= Type 77 submachine gun =

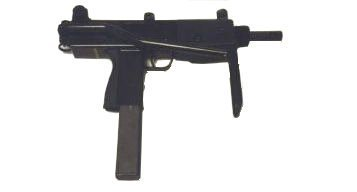
- Type: Submachine gun
- Place of origin: Taiwan (Republic of China)

Production history
- Designed: 1985
- Manufacturer: Hsing Hua Arsenal

Specifications
- Mass: 2.82 kg empty
- Length: 335 mm (13.19 in) with stock folded; 610 mm (24.02 in) with stock extended
- Barrel length: 215 mm (8.46 in)
- Cartridge: 9×19mm Parabellum
- Caliber: 9 mm
- Action: Blowback
- Rate of fire: 1200–1500 RPM
- Maximum firing range: 150 m (492 ft)
- Feed system: 30/32 round box magazines
- Sights: Iron

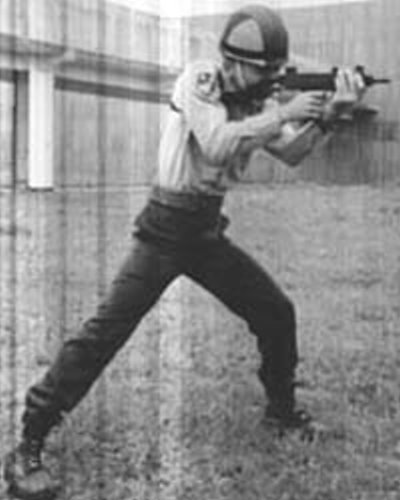

The Type 77 (Chinese: T77衝鋒槍) is a submachine gun of Taiwanese origin, produced by the 205th Arsenal.

== Development ==
The T77 was developed in the 1980s, based on the Ingram MAC-11 and the Cobray M11/9.

== Users ==
- Taiwan: It is known to be used by the ROC Military Police.
