= Claridge Hi-Tec/Goncz Pistol =

Semi-automatic handgun designed by Lajos John Goncz

Claridge Hi-Tec
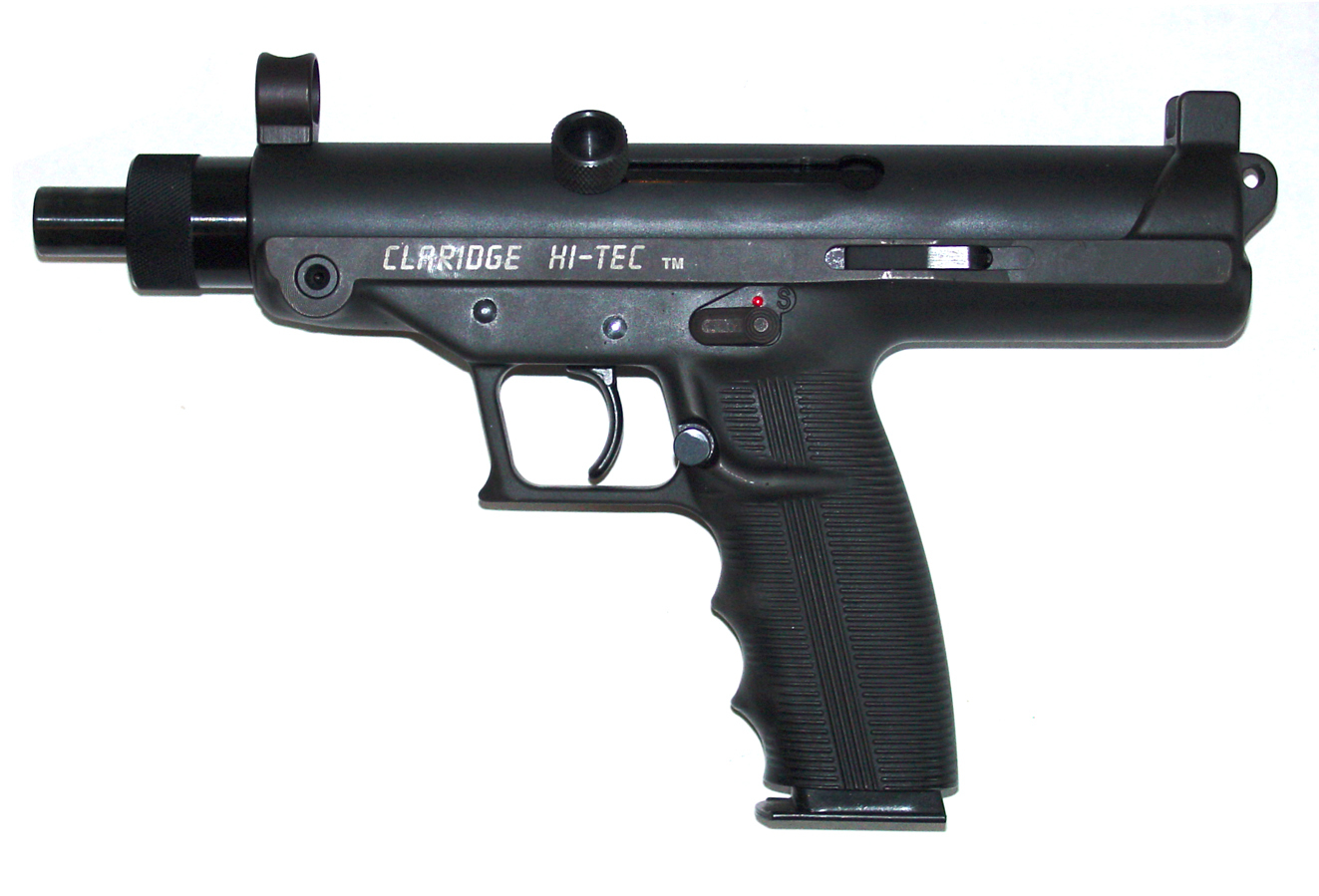
- The Claridge Hi-Tec S9
- Type: Semi-automatic pistol
- Place of origin: United States

Production history
- Designer: Lajos John Goncz
- Manufacturer: Claridge Hi-Tec, Inc. (CLD)
- Produced: 1990–1993
- Variants: See variants

Specifications
- Barrel length: 127 mm (5 in)
- Cartridge: 9×19mm Parabellum.40 S&W.45 ACP; 7.63x25mm Mauser.38 Super
- Action: Blowback-operated
- Effective firing range: 40 m (43 yards)
- Feed system: 18 or 36-round detachable box magazine (9mm); 10 or 20-round magazine (.45 ACP)
- Sights: Square notch rear, vertical hooded post front

The Claridge Hi-Tec and its antecedent, the Goncz High-Tech Long Pistol, are semi-automatic pistols designed by Hungarian inventor Lajos John Goncz. This unique firearm features a telescopic bolt design encased in a tubular upper receiver with a forged steel frame, button rifled matched barrels, and 16-round magazines standard.

== History ==
Goncz Armament, Inc. of North Hollywood, CA designed, prototyped, and produced a few hundred High-Tech Long Pistols models GA and GS between 1984 and 1990. The company made survival daggers using the same pistol grip for the knife handles.

The Claridge pistols and carbines were based on this design. In 1990, Claridge Hi-Tec, Inc. was created by Joe and Gail Claridge who incorporated Claridge Hi-Tec, Inc. in Northridge, CA. Claridge used this design to produce pistol models S, L, T, ZL-9 and ZT-9, and carbine models C, LEC-9 and ZLEC-9. However, the property rights of the design and rights to produce the weapon came under dispute. In 1993 Claridge Hi-Tec was forced to cease operations due to the government outlawing the guns in the State of California. Plans are underway to begin building Goncz pistols again.

== Design ==
The lower receiver/frame is a one-piece machined design integral with the pistol grip and trigger guard. It houses all the firing components and the safety mechanism. The magazine is fed through the pistol grip. 16-, 20- and 30-round magazines were made for the weapon, but have not been in production since 1993. However, re-notched Beretta 92F magazines can be used, and many of those found on the market today are in fact modified Beretta or SIG magazines.

Claridge S9 with upper receiver separated from the frame

The upper receiver is a one-piece tube with a screwed in match barrel. Goncz Armament utilized heat treated 4130 solid chrome alloy for the receiver tube. On the Goncz GA and Claridge T and L models, and all rifles, it also acts as a barrel shroud. The receiver tube houses the bolt, guide rods and guide springs. All Claridge Hi-Tec and Goncz Armament firearms utilize match barrels manufactured in-house that are button-rifled.

The Goncz bolt structure is a clone of the SA-VZ23 submachine gun. This design utilizes a blowback-operated telescopic bolt system housed in the upper receiver tube.

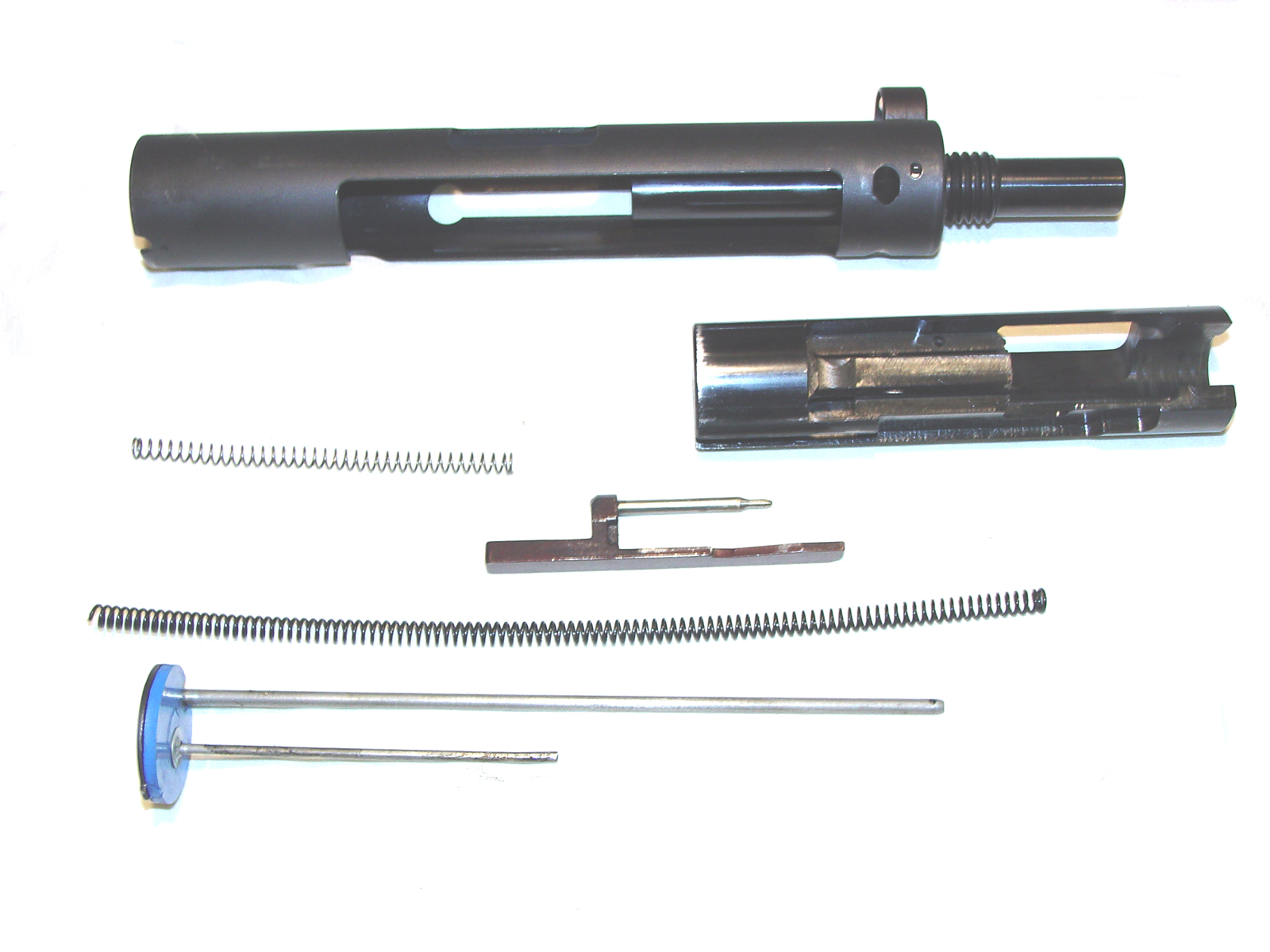
Claridge S9 upper receiver components

The bolt travels on a firing rod which protrudes through the bolt, left of center, next to the firing pin, and a guide rod located at the top of the bolt. Both rods and their corresponding springs are attached to the spring holder base plate. A recoil buffer sits on the base plate to prevent damage to the bolt when cycling.

The firing pin is attached to a striker plate that travels in a channel on the left side of the bolt when cycling.

The iron sights consist of a square notch in the rear, and a vertical hooded post in the front. There are no accessory rails and no adapters have been produced for the use of a scope or other aiming devices.

== Operation ==
The Goncz action cycles as a closed-bolt mechanism. The user operates the bolt with a knob on the upper-left side of the gun similar to a TEC-9. When Claridge Hi-Tec began production, they modified the Goncz design by adding a bolt hold-open button on the left side of the frame. None of the guns produced by Goncz Arms had this feature. However, this is only for inspection as the bolt cannot travel forward from this position with a magazine inserted. The user must insert the magazine with the bolt closed and cock the gun in order to chamber a round.

== Variants ==
Claridge produced five models of the Hi-Tec pistols and three models of the Hi-Tec carbines:

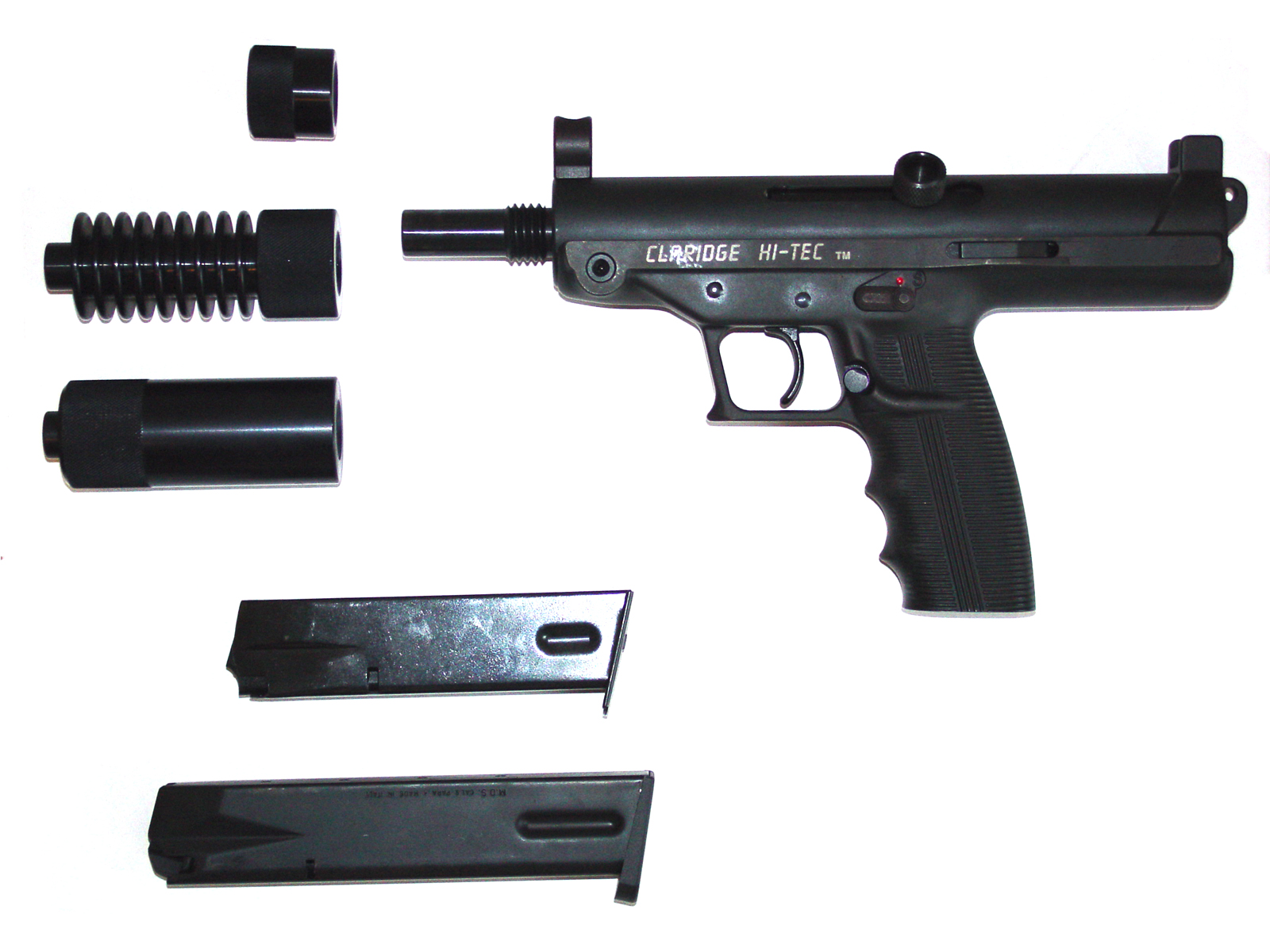
The Claridge Hi-Tec S9 with available attachments.

=== Pistols ===
S9: A duplicate of the Goncz Armament GS-9, with the exception of the bolt hold open; there was no bolt hold open on any Goncz Armament model. A model marketed as a "sub-compact" (although this is misleading as it is far from being subcompact) with a 5" threaded barrel capable of receiving various attachments. These include a threaded barrel protector, a smooth 3" barrel extension, a ribbed 3" barrel extension, and a shrouded extension. Theoretically, a silencer could also be attached.

S45: Same design as the S9, except chambered in .45 ACP.

T9/L9: Similar to the Goncz Armament GA-9, these 9 mm target models utilizes a 9.5" shrouded button rifled match barrel. These pistols are highly accurate, therefore "target model" is apt in this case. The L9 model can be identified by the 7.5" barrel and a shorter barrel shroud that the T9. These pistols and carbines all came with a blued upper receiver, and with either a black aluminum lower frame, or with a silver stainless steel lower frame.

T45/L45: Same design as the T9/L9, except chambered in .45 ACP.

ZL-9: Unknown.

ZT-9: Unknown.

=== Carbines ===
All Hi-Tec semi-automatic carbines use 16" shrouded button rifled match barrels.

C9—Walnut stock and forend chambered in 9 mm.

C45—Walnut stock and forend chambered in .45 caliber. There are no known Claridge .45 ACP Carbines

LEC9—Black synthetic stock and forend chambered in 9 mm.

LEC45—Black synthetic stock and forend chambered in .45 caliber. There are no known Claridge .45 ACP Carbines

ZLEC9—Unknown.

=== Goncz Armament Models ===
The Goncz Hi-Tech Models were introduced in 1984 in the following Models:

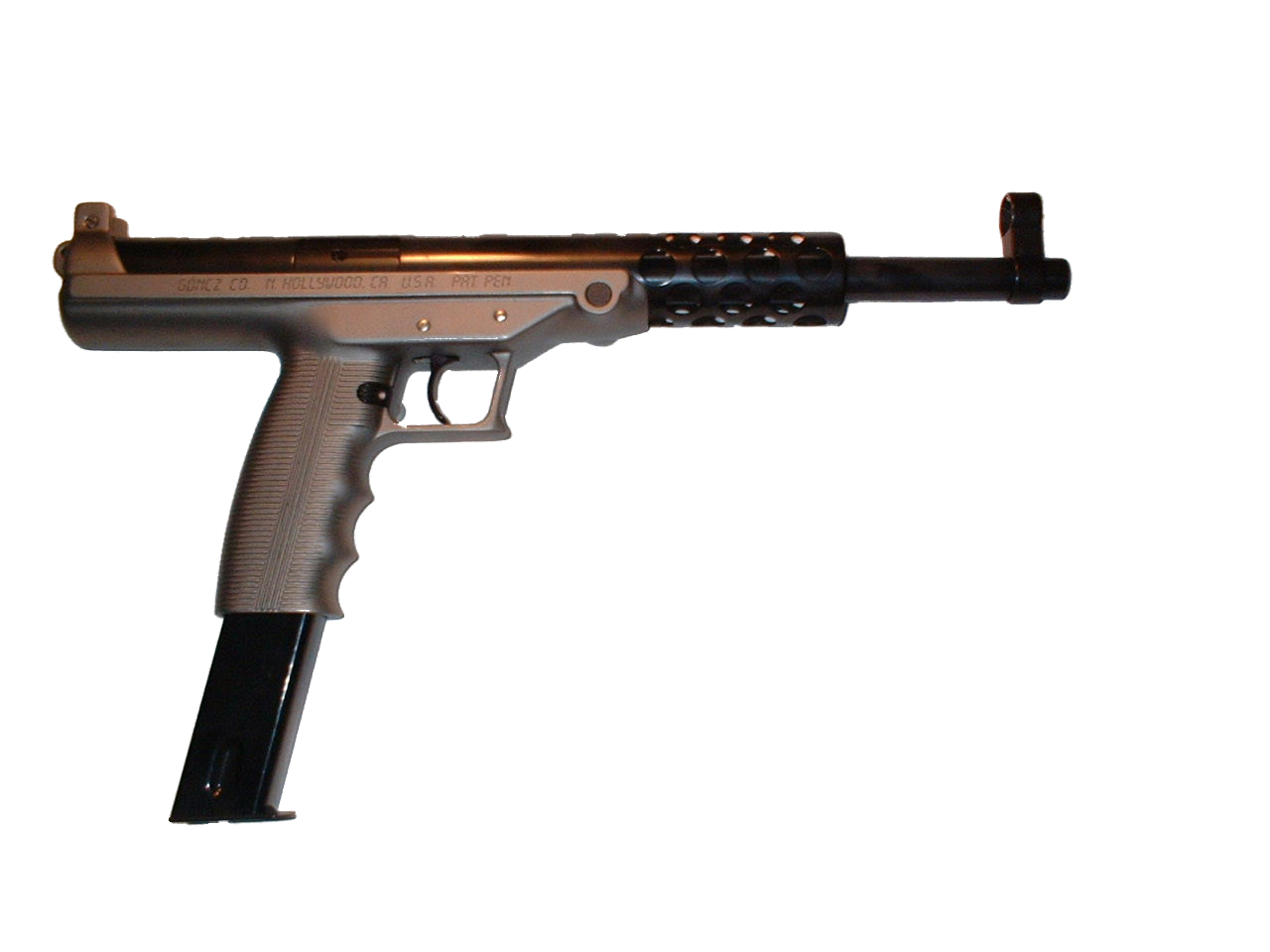
The original Goncz GA

GS—Goncz Special: GS-9 (9 mm), GS-4 (.45 ACP) and GS-3 (.30) Mauser with 5.5 inch threaded barrel is able to accept silencers with a 3/4—13 thread; also will accept a barrel extension or a thread protector.

GA—Goncz Assault Pistol GA-9 (9 mm), GA-4 (.45 ACP) and GA-3 (.30 Mauser) has a longer barrel at 9.5 inches and a barrel shroud for heatsinking.

GC—Goncz Carbine GC-9 (9 mm) with walnut forearm.

GCL—Goncz Carbine with Laser GCL-9 (9 mm) has the "Terminator II" Laser as an integral part of the gun.

GCLight—Goncz Carbine with Light GCLight-9 (9 mm), and the light is integral part of the gun frame.

== See also ==
- List of pistols
- ST Kinetics CPW
