= Colt Ace =

- Type: Semi-automatic pistol

Service history
- Used by: United States

Production history
- Produced: 1931–1947

Specifications
- Length: 8.25 inches (21.0 cm)
- Barrel length: 4.75 inches (12.1 cm)
- Cartridge: .22 LR
- Sights: Adjustable rear, fixed front

The Colt Ace or Colt Service Model Ace is a Colt Model 1911-derived semi-automatic firearm chambered for the .22 Long Rifle cartridge instead of .45 ACP. It was created in 1931 and produced through 1947 to allow inexpensive and low-recoil sub-caliber training while maintaining the feel of the military Model 1911 pistol.

== History ==
The sub-caliber Colt Ace was derived from the powerful .45 ACP chambered Colt 1911 to allow military, police, or civilian shooters to train with the Ace without the recoil and expense of the 1911, but with similar ergonomics and sighting. Chambered for the far less powerful .22 LR cartridge, its barrel was constructed (on all but the earliest models) with a hinged floating rear chamber that amplifies the recoil when cycling the heavy slide, giving it more of the feel of the larger, heavier weapon.

== Users ==
- United States
  - United States Navy: Used as a training pistol, designated the Pistol, Caliber .22, Colt, Service Ace (1950) and Pistol, Caliber .22 Colt, Ace (1960).
