= Chropei =

Greek chemical company

- Native name: ΧΡΩΠΕΙ - Χρωματουργία Πειραιώς
- Industry: Synthetic dyes; Pharmaceuticals; Firearms
- Founded: 1883; 143 years ago in Greece
- Founder: Spilios and Leontios Economides
- Defunct: 1995
- Fate: Bankrupt
- Headquarters: Greece
- Products: Chropi rifle; Chropi GP10 submachine gun

Chropei, also spelled as Chropi (ΧΡΩΠΕΙ - Χρωματουργία Πειραιώς, Piraeus Dye Works), was a historic Greek chemical company. It was founded in 1883 by chemists Spilios and Leontios Economides (the former having been a co-worker of Adolf von Baeyer) and has traditionally been a major synthetic dye and pharmaceuticals manufacturer.

CHROPI Rifle (1975)

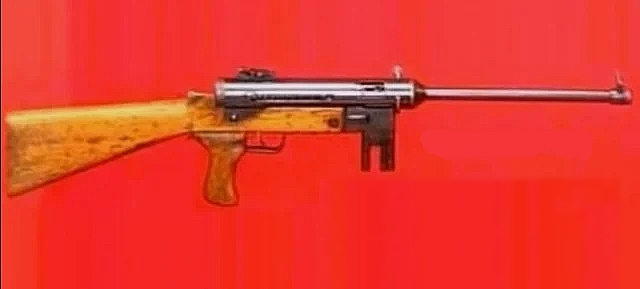
Makrykano M1943 submachine gun (1943) - possibly developed by Chropi

An important contributor to Greece's defence effort during World War II, it diversified, after 1950, into several other chemical products. In 1975 it made a rather bold move, proposing two types of guns (rifle and submachine gun) to the Military of Greece. The guns had been developed by a team under Sotiris Sofianopoulos (the origin of their basic structure is apparently connected with a Greek-Cypriot design), while existing company infrastructure had been improved to allow massive production. A relatively small number - a few more than 100 units - was produced while testing by the Hellenic Army was under way, initially indicating "positive" performance. According to the final test results, though, the guns did not meet the desired standards (the designs indeed seemed outdated, but the decision was also probably connected with the creation of the state-owned EBO company) and the produced stock ended up in Army storage facilities.

Chropei was virtually bankrupt when it was nationalized in the 1980s with its name changed to ELVIPY (ΕΛΒΙΠΥ - Ελληνική Βιομηχανία Προϊόντων Υγείας, Greek Health Products Company). After a few more years in a financial mess, it closed down altogether in 1995. The company's ruined original buildings on Pireos Street are often cited as a testimony to Greece's neglect of a large part of its industrial history.

- "Αργοσβήνει η ιστορική «ΧΡΩΠΕΙ»" [Historic Chropei Plant is Crumbling Away], Kathimerini (in Greek), April 15, 2007
- Theodoros Dimopoulos, "Opla Ellinikis Epinoisis kai Kataskevis (Greek-developed and produced Arms)", article in Greek Panzer magazine, issue 24, January-February 2006.
- L.S. Skartsis, "Modern Greece's Machines: A Comprehensive Guide to Greek Vehicle & Machine Manufacturers (1700 to Present)" (2026) ISBN 978-618-00-6734-7 (eBook)
