= Cooper T90 =

The Cooper T90 was a Formula 5000 racing car built by the British racing team Cooper in 1969.

== Development and racing history ==
"A production run of 24 cars was launched and the Cooper-Chevrolet T90 can be expected to be a smash hit."

With this announcement, published in a brochure in 1969, the British racing team, which was about to end its career, wanted to draw attention to the new racing vehicle. The company could not transfer the optimism that was spread by Cooper about the brochure into the real racing car construction. Only two T90s were built. Both vehicles, which were based on the Cooper T86 from Formula One, were presented at a number of racing car exhibitions in early 1969. One vehicle was tested intensively, but never used in the factory.

When Cooper stopped racing in June 1969, the two T90s were sold with the rest of the inventory. The T90s ran until the early 1970s, revised several times (one was given a Ford engine in place of the Chevrolet), and used by privateer teams in the European Formula 5000 Championship, first in September 1969 by Chris Warwick-Drake at the final race of the 1969 season. Then, with the last two Cooper monopostos, the once so successful racing team finally disappeared from the international racetracks.
