= Cooey 60 =

Cooey Model 60
- Type: Firearm
- Place of origin: Canada

Production history
- Designer: H.W. Cooey Machine & Arms Company
- Produced: 1939-1967
- Variants: Winchester Model 600

Specifications

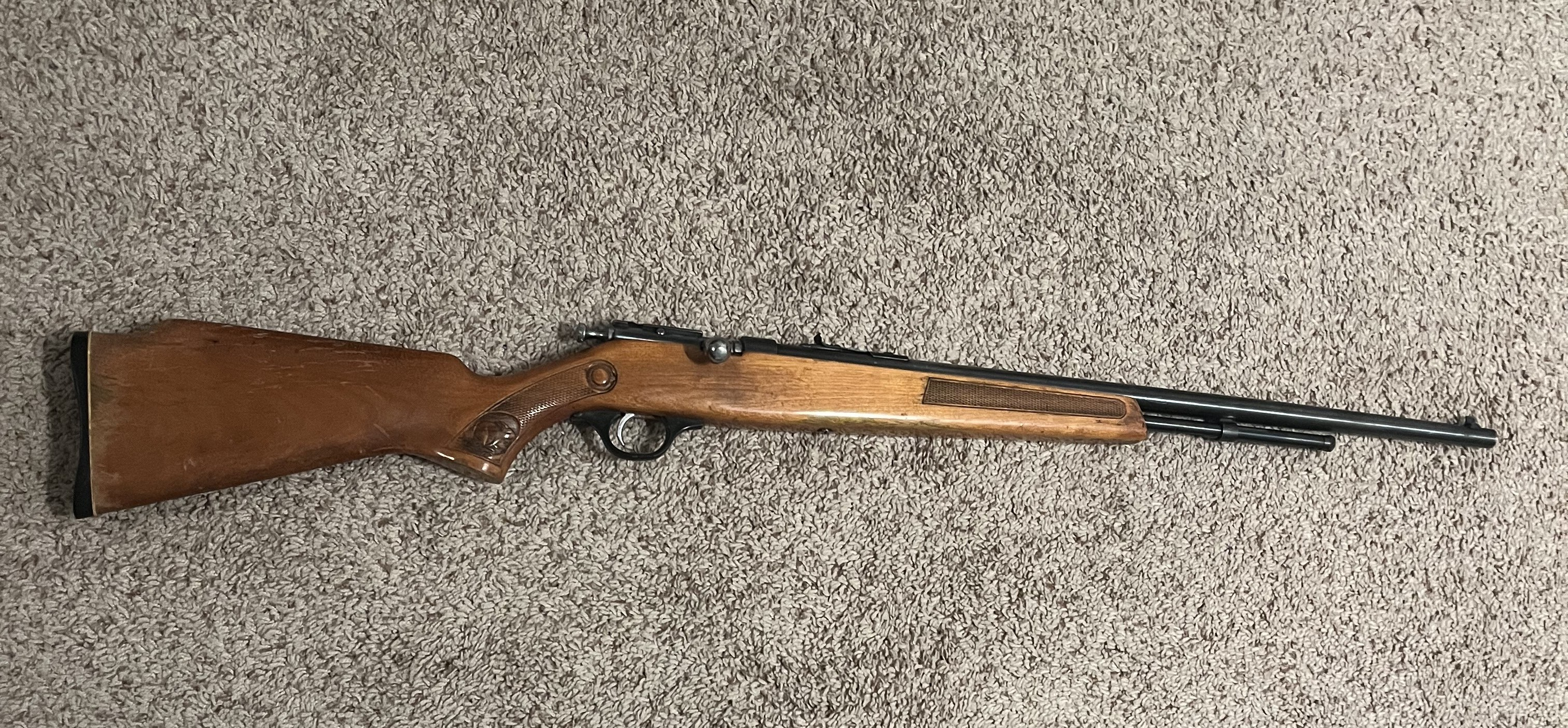
A Winchester Model 600 "Jack Rabbit Special", featuring the updated polymer trigger guard, and Phillips pan head stock screw.

The Cooey Model 60 is a bolt-action repeating rifle that appeared in 1939 –1940, capable of firing .22 short, .22 long and .22 LR (long rifle) rimfire cartridges. The Model 60 featured a tubular magazine, capable of holding 10+1 (.22 LR) to 15+1 (.22 Short) cartridges. It was manufactured by H.W. Cooey Machine & Arms Company in Cobourg, Ontario, Canada, until 1979. Much like its single-shot Model 75 and Model 39 counterparts, the Model 60 would sometimes feature "Ranger" stamped into the receiver preceding the model number. This prefix was used as a marketing word by Cooey and various department stores that sold the rifle.

== Winchester Model 600 ==
The "Model 60" moniker was replaced by the "Model 600" branding in 1967 following the Olin Corporation purchase of H.W. Cooey Machine & Arms. The Winchester Model 600 was functionally identical to the Model 60, with minor changes to the platform. The trigger guard of Model 600's would be made of polymer, and the knurled thumbscrew joining the receiver and stock was replaced with a Phillips pan head screw. The fore end of the stock on the Model 600 is notably longer than the Model 60's. Some Model 600 Cooey rifles were produced with a rabbit engraved into the stock; This configuration is informally known as the "Jackrabbit Special".

== Similarities With Other Cooey Rifles ==
The Cooey Model 60 shares various design characteristics with Cooey's previous rifles. The bolt assembly on the Model 60 is a very similar design to the Model 38 and Model 75; however, it has been adapted to fully cock itself when the shooter cycles the action. The bolts on single shot Cooey rifles can be modified to emulate this functionality, at the cost of the rifle's safe operation in its unmodified state. When the shooter cycles the action on a single-shot Cooey rifle, the bolt assembly is in a half cock state. To prepare the rifle to fire, the user has to manually pull the striker until it reaches its rest point. This makes Cooey non-repeating rifles exceptionally safe and almost impossible to fire accidentally.

== See also ==
- Cooey Canuck
