= Calico M100 =

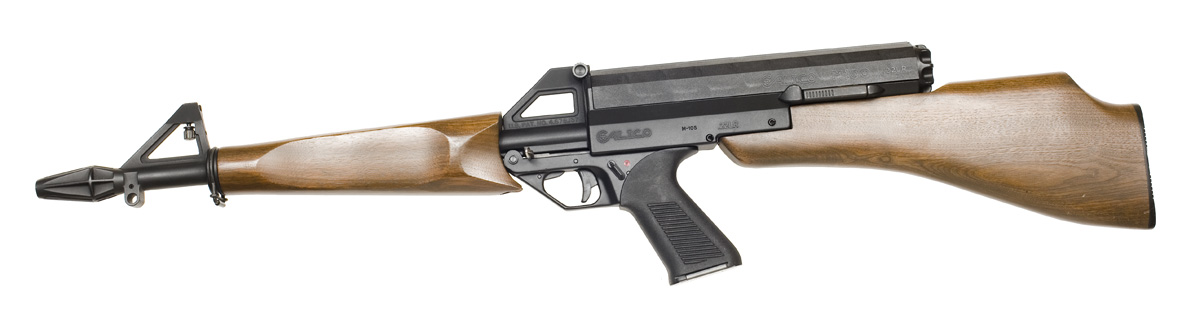
- M105, walnut-stocked variant of the M100 carbine
- Type: Pistol-caliber carbine
- Place of origin: United States

Production history
- Manufacturer: Calico Light Weapons Systems

Specifications
- Mass: 3.7 pounds (1.7 kg) unloaded
- Barrel length: 16 inches (410 mm)
- Cartridge: .22 LR
- Caliber: .22
- Action: Blowback
- Rate of fire: Semi-automatic
- Muzzle velocity: 1,400 ft/s (430 m/s)
- Effective firing range: 100 yards (91 m)
- Feed system: 50- or 100-round magazine

The M100 is a blowback-operated semi-automatic rifle chambered in .22 LR, manufactured by Calico Light Weapons Systems in Elgin, Oregon, United States. It was originally designed and released in the 1980s to be of use by law enforcement and the military.

== Legislation ==
With a high capacity helical-fed magazine mounted on top of the weapon, the introduction of the Federal assault weapons ban made manufacture of the Calico family of weapons for sale to civilians illegal - except the .22 caliber rimfire models which were exempt from the ban - until the legislation expired on September 13, 2004, in accordance with its sunset provision.

The company is now allowed to build the firearm to their original configuration.

== See also ==
- American-180
