= Colt Mustang XSP =

Single-action pocket pistol

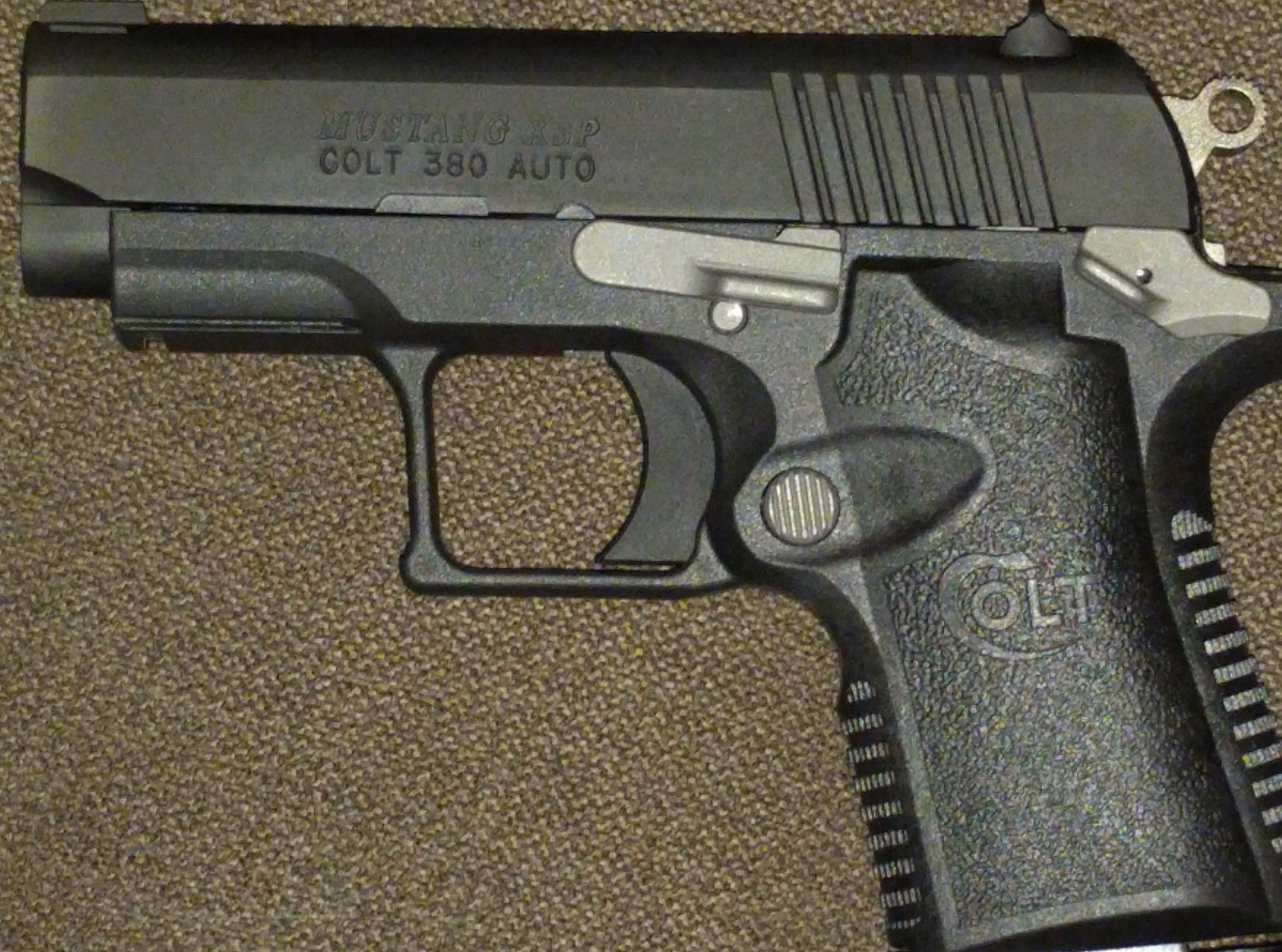
Colt Mustang Pocket XSP

The Colt Mustang XSP is a lightweight, single-action pocket pistol chambered for the .380 ACP cartridge, produced by Colt's Manufacturing Company. This firearm model was introduced in 2013 with an updated polymer frame version, of the Mustang Pocketlite.

== Brief history ==
In 2013, Colt introduced the Mustang XSP, a new polymer frame version with updated design. This included front and back strap checking, molded grips, squared off and undercut trigger guard, ambidextrous safety, drift-able sights, single slot accessory rail, polymer guide rod.

== Specifications ==
- Chambering: .380 ACP
- Weight: 11.80 ounces
- Weight with empty magazine: 12.3 ounces
- Trigger Pull: 4 pounds 5 ounces
- Barrel Length: 2.815 inches
- Barrel Diameter: 0.472 inch
- Overall Height: 3.94 inches
- Overall Length: 5.6 inches
- Grip Width: 1.02 inches
- Slide Width: 0.756 inch
- Maximum Width: 1.17 inches
- Trigger Reach: 2.36 inches
- Magazine Capacity: 6+1
- Sights: Black, windage adjustable
- Accessory Rail: Yes
