= Type 90 machine gun =

T90 Machine Gun
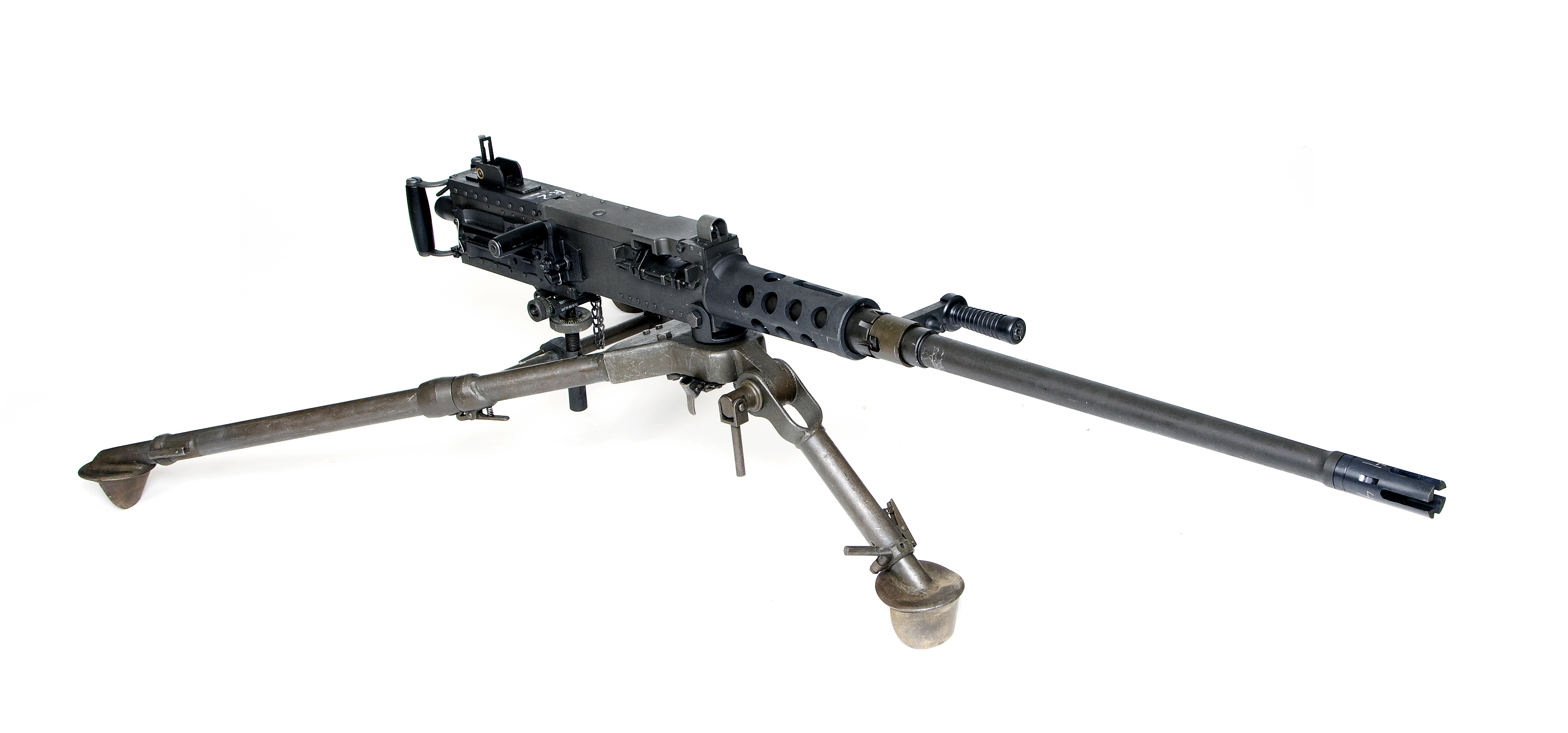
- Image is a Browning M2E2 to represent the near-identical weapon
- Type: Heavy Machine Gun
- Place of origin: Taiwan

Service history
- In service: 2001–present
- Used by: Taiwan

Production history
- Designer: 205th Armory
- Designed: 2001
- Manufacturer: 205th Armory
- Produced: 2001-

Specifications
- Mass: 38 kg (excluding tripod)
- Length: 1746 mm
- Barrel length: 1236 mm
- Cartridge: .50 BMG (12.7 x 99 mm NATO)
- Caliber: 12.7 mm (0.50 inch)
- Action: Recoil-operated; short recoil
- Rate of fire: 450-635 rounds/min
- Muzzle velocity: 920 m/s
- Effective firing range: 2000 m (anti-ground), 1400 m (anti-air)
- Maximum firing range: 6800 m
- Feed system: Belt-fed
- Sights: Iron; Night Vision.

The T90 is a heavy machine gun developed at the 205th Armory of Combined Service Forces, Ministry of Defense, Republic of China (Taiwan). It is intended as a replacement for the M2 heavy machine gun.
