= Colt Commander =

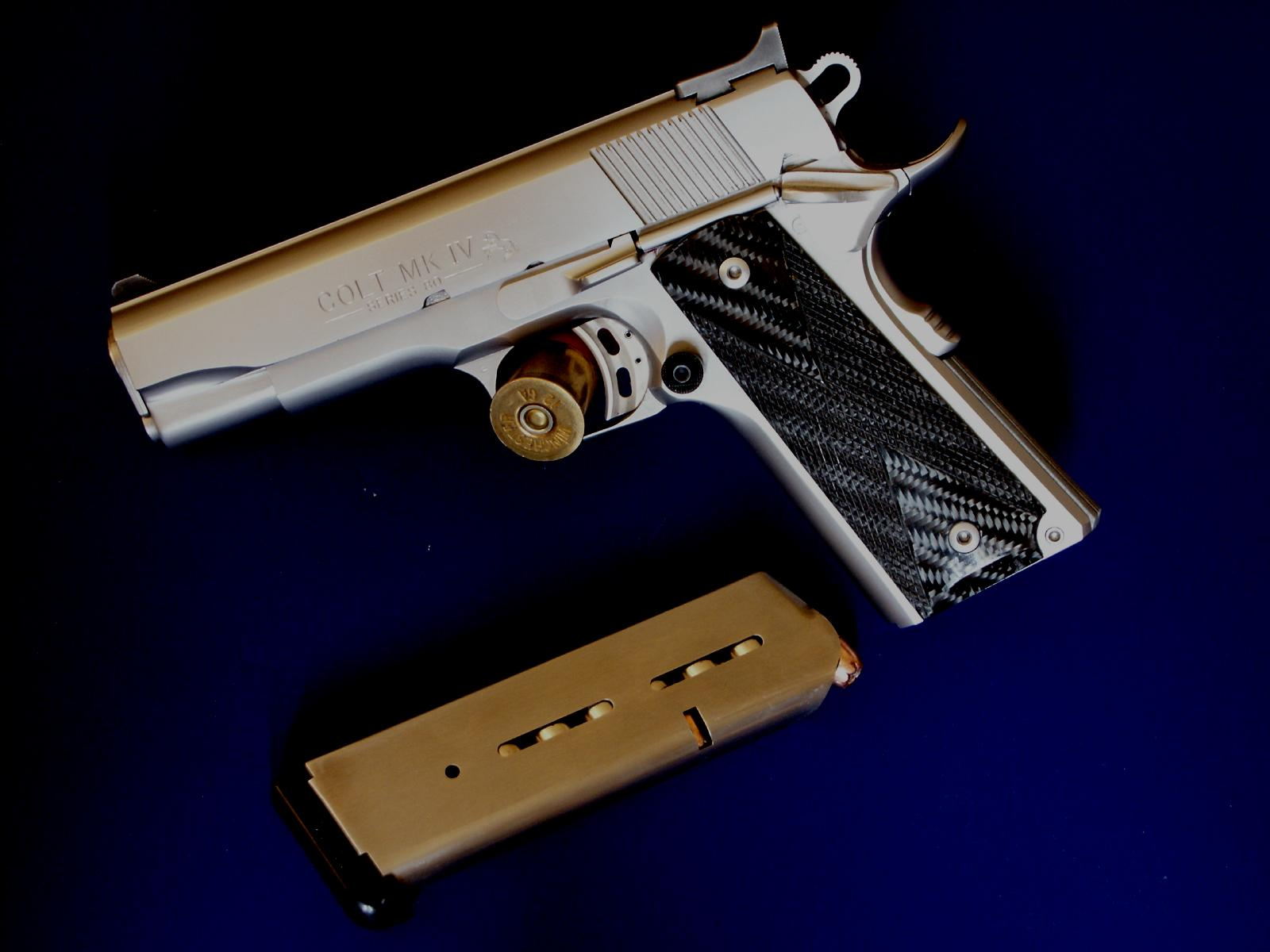
- A MK IV .45 ACP Colt Combat Commander.
- Type: Semi-automatic pistol
- Place of origin: United States

Production history
- Designed: 1949
- Produced: 1950–present
- Variants: Lightweight Commander; Combat Commander; Commander Gold Cup Colt; Combat Elite; Concealed Carry Officer's pistol

Specifications
- Barrel length: 4.25 in (107.95 mm)
- Cartridge: 9×19mm Parabellum; .38 Super; .45 ACP
- Action: Short recoil operation
- Feed system: box magazine: 7-round or 8-round (.45 ACP); 9-round (9 mm and .38 Super)

The Colt Commander is a single-action, semi-automatic, magazine-fed, and recoil-operated handgun based on the John Browning-designed M1911.

== History ==
The pistol that would eventually be named the Colt Commander was Colt's Manufacturing Company's candidate in a U.S. government post–World War II trial to find a lighter replacement for the M1911 pistol that would be issued to officers.

Requirements were issued in 1949 that the pistol had to be chambered for 9 mm Parabellum and could not exceed 7 inches in length or weigh more than 25 ounces.

Candidates included Browning Hi-Power variants by Canada's Inglis and Belgium's Fabrique Nationale, and Smith & Wesson's S&W Model 39. Colt entered a modified version of their M1911 pistol that was chambered for 9 mm Parabellum, had an aluminum alloy frame, a short 4.25-inch barrel, and a 9-round magazine.

In 1950, Colt moved their candidate into regular production. It was the first aluminum-framed large frame pistol in major production and the first Colt pistol to be originally chambered in 9 mm Parabellum.

The first year's production included .45 ACP and .38 Super chamberings.

In 1970, Colt introduced the all-steel "Colt Combat Commander", with an optional model in satin nickel. To differentiate between the two models, the aluminum-framed model was renamed the "Lightweight Commander".

== Variants ==
Colt made several variations of the Commander and offered it in .45 ACP and .38 Super chamberings. Other variants followed with different degrees of factory accurizing and materials.

The .45 ACP "Colt Commander Gold Cup" was designed to offer competition-ready out-of-the-box performance in National Match competition. It came with one 8-round magazine plus a separate recoil spring and one 7-round magazine for wadcutter ammunition.

The "Colt Combat Elite" was specialized for combat-style match shooters. The .45 ACP model comes with two 8-round magazines and the .38 Super model with two 9-round magazines.

The "C.C.O." or "Concealed Carry Officer's" pistol mated the slide and barrel assembly of the stainless-steel Commander with the shorter frame of the blued Lightweight Officer's ACP.

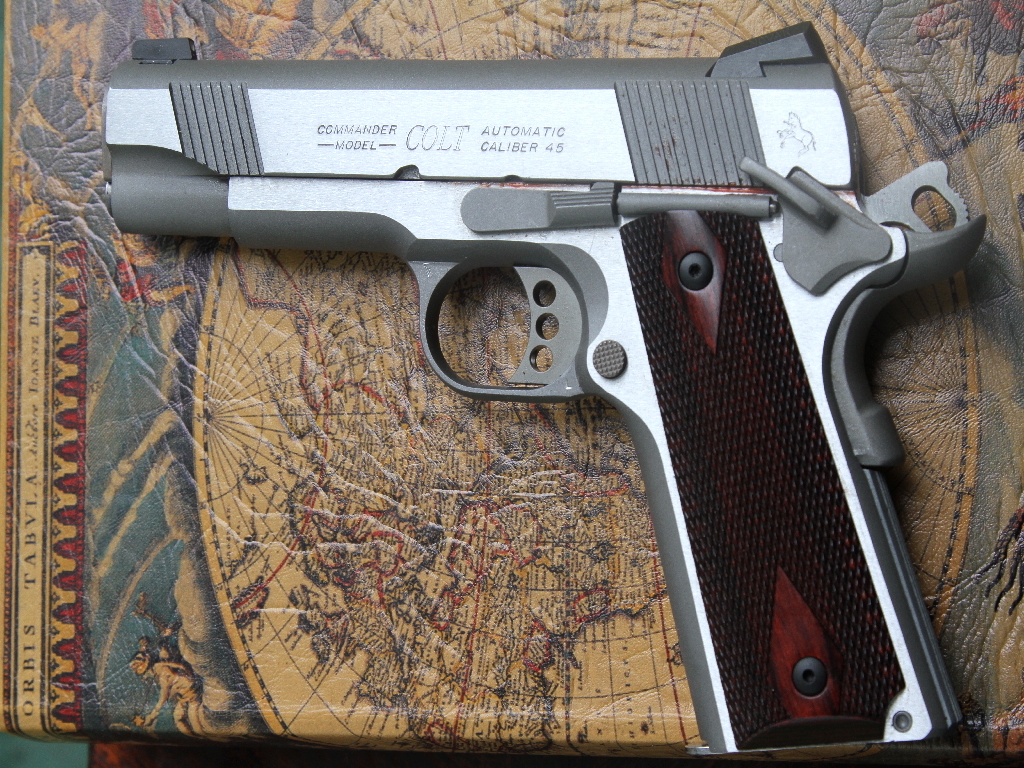
The XSE variation of the Colt Combat Commander

A limited run of the Colt Lightweight Commander in 7.65mm Luger was made for export in the early 1970s. In the 80’s, a Combat Commander was produced in 9x23mm Steyr for a limited run

== Legacy ==
It was the first mass-produced American pistol with an aluminium alloy frame and the first Colt pistol to be chambered in 9mm Parabellum.
