= Waterman Ormsby =

American engraver and inventor (1809–1883)

Waterman Lily Ormsby
- Born: Waterman Lily Ormsby; September 9, 1809; Hampton, Connecticut
- Died: November 1, 1883 (aged 73); Brooklyn, New York, United States
- Occupation: engraver
- Spouse: Julia Ann Brainard (1830-1846)
- Children: Waterman L. Ormsby, Josephine Ormsby Hasam

Waterman Lily Ormsby (September 9, 1809 – November 1, 1883) was an American engraver and inventor who founded the Continental Bank Note Company and invented a pantographic engraving machine called the grammagraph to produce "roll-die" engraving on metal.

== Early life ==
Ormsby was born in Hampton, Connecticut and became an apprentice in an engraving shop at a young age. In 1829, he attended the National Academy of Design in New York City. Upon graduating he moved to Albany, New York where he engraved over his own name for a few years then to Lancaster, Massachusetts, where he worked for the firm of Carter, Andrews & Co. Eventually, he settled in New York City where he founded the New York Bank Note Company and became one of the founders of the Continental Bank Note Company.

He married Julia Ann Brainard in 1830 and they divorced in 1846.

== Engraving ==
Ormsby was an excellent line engraver and was called upon for a great deal of work for bank notes were in wide use by the Government at the time of the Civil War. He designed the five-dollar note, intended to prevent counterfeiting and was the author of several pamphlets, including, "Cycloidal Configurations" or the Harvest of Counterfeiture, and a volume on paper-money engraving entitled, A description of the Present System of Bank Note Engraving, which was published in 1852.

=== The Columbian Magazine ===
Ormsby provided engraving plates for illustrations for The Columbian Magazine', a journal known for printing the stories of Edgar Allan Poe along with political and technological stories, from its first issue. He purchased controlling interest in the magazine in 1847, but readership declined and the magazine eventually failed.

== Inventions ==
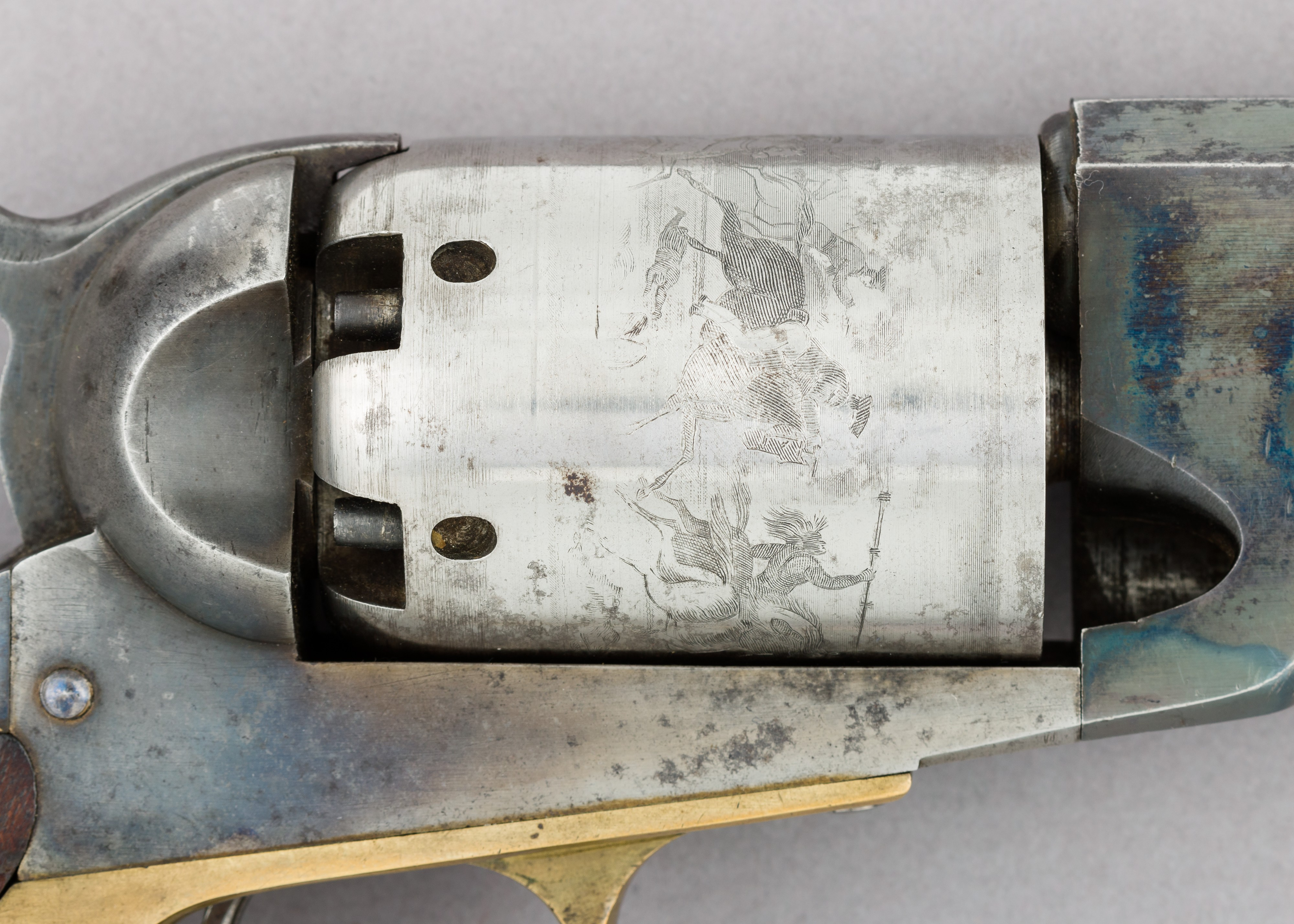
The cylinder of Colt Walker revolver number 1017, held by the Metropolitan Museum of Art; Ormsby's engraved battle scene can be partially seen

Dedicated to stopping counterfeiters, Ormsby invented the “grammagraph", a machine used to copy medals and medallions onto bank note dies in order to give the illusion of a bas-relief. The device was later used as a pantographic engraving machine to produce "roll-die" engraving on metal. The machine automated an existing engraving technique that varied spaces between parallel contour lines to give the impression of depth to a print. In Ormsby's case this was most famously used on the cylinders of revolvers made by Samuel Colt of Colt Firearms. Ormsby produced half a dozen engraving scenes for Colt as early as 1839 and these were featured on models such as the Colt Walker, Colt Dragoon Revolver, Colt Model 1849 Pocket Revolver, Colt 1851 Navy Revolver, and Colt Model 1855 Sidehammer Pocket Revolver.

Other inventions by Ormsby included a refined transfer press, medal-ruling machines and geometric lathes that took engraving from human hands to machinery. This was because for the majority of his career he worked alone or with one assistant.

Ormsby is said to have helped Samuel Morse in the creation of the Morse alphabet.

== Later life ==
Ormsby died in Brooklyn, New York, on December 8, 1883. He was the father of Waterman L. Ormsby a reporter for the New York Herald.

== Works by Ormsby ==
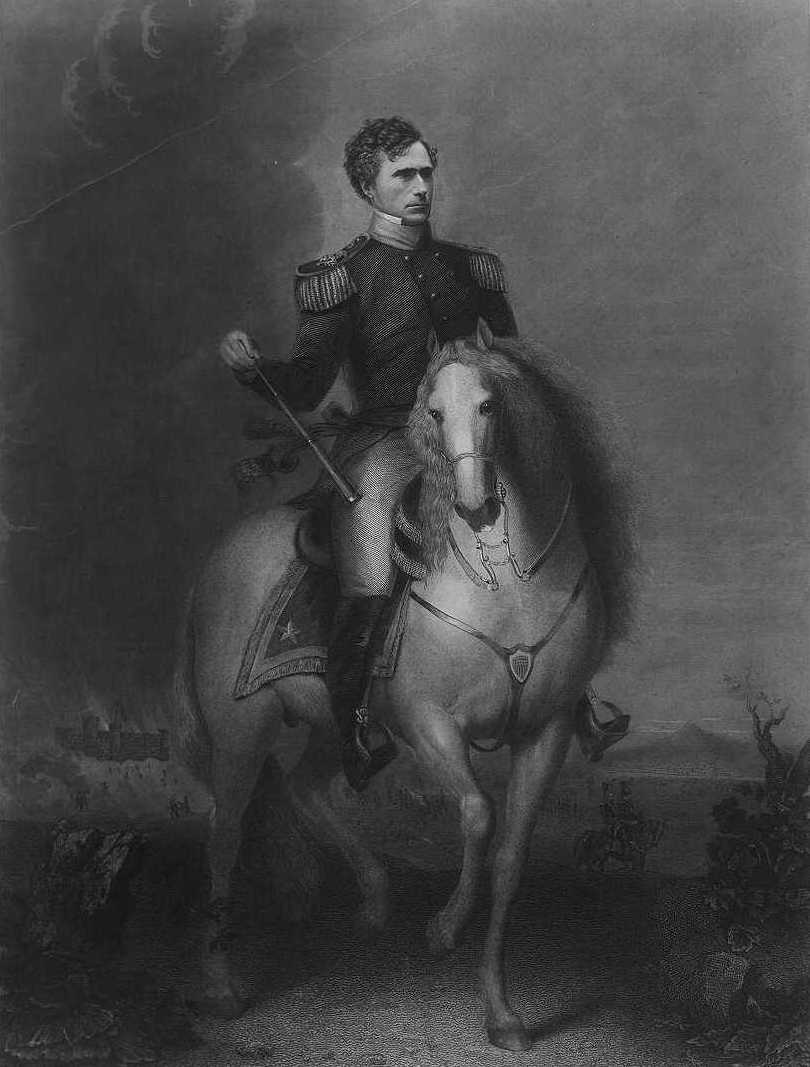
Engraving of Franklin Pierce

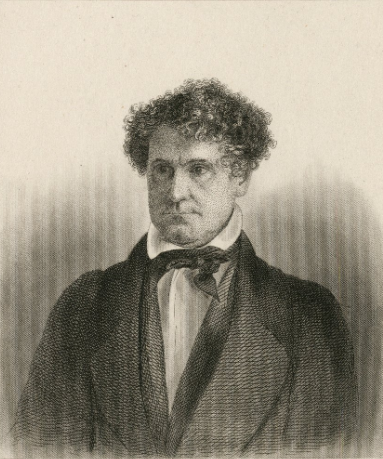
Engraving of Thomas Hamblin

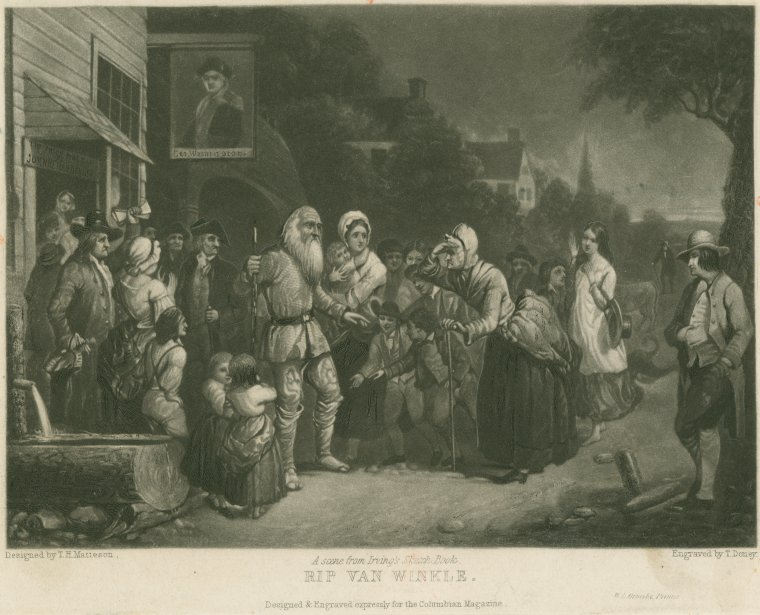
Engraving of Rip Van Winkle from The Columbian Magazine

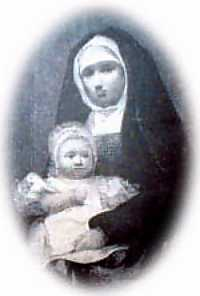
Fictionalized engraving of Maria Monk
