= Colt 1851 Navy Revolver =

1851 revolver by Samuel Colt

1851 Colt Revolving Navy Pistol
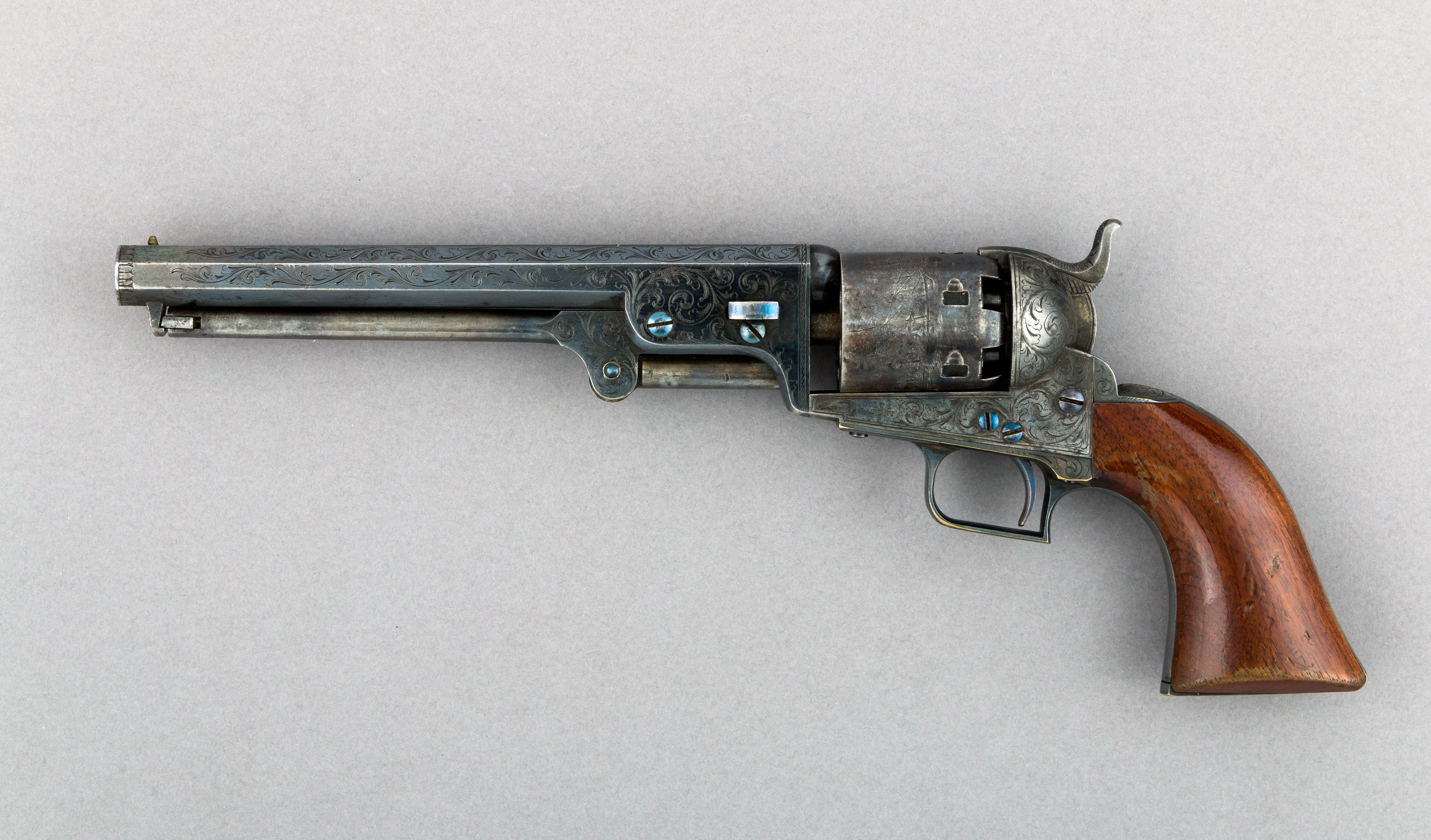
- Colt 1851 Navy Revolving Pistol, serial no 2
- Type: Revolver
- Place of origin: United States

Service history
- In service: 1851–1873
- Used by: United States; Confederate States; Native Americans; First Nations in Canada; Hawaiian Kingdom; United Kingdom; Canada; Australia; South Africa; France; Austrian Empire; Austria-Hungary; German Empire; Russian Empire; Ottoman Empire; Poland; Norway; Sweden; Brazil; Argentina; Kingdom of Italy; Denmark; Netherlands; Dutch Empire; Belgium; Qing dynasty; Joseon dynasty; Empire of Japan; Empire of Brazil; Second Mexican Empire; Mexico; Tokugawa Shogunate
- Wars: List: Taiping Rebellion 1850–1864; Crimean War 1853–1856; Indian Mutiny 1857–1858; Bleeding Kansas 1854-1859; Second Italian War of Independence 1859; Expedition of the Thousand 1860–1861; American Civil War 1861–1865; American Indian Wars; Second French intervention in Mexico; New Zealand wars; January Uprising 1863–1864; Second Schleswig War 1864; Paraguayan War 1864–1870; Austro-Prussian War 1866; Third Italian War of Independence 1866; Boshin War 1868-1869; Fenian Raids; Red River Rebellion; Krivošije uprising 1869; Franco-Prussian War 1870–1871; Satsuma Rebellion 1877; Russo-Turkish War 1877–1878; Australian frontier wars; Free State-Basotho Wars; Transvaal Civil War; Eureka Rebellion; Fenian Rising; Reform War

Production history
- Designer: Samuel Colt
- Designed: 1850
- Manufacturer: Colt's Patent Firearms Manufacturing Company, Hartford, Conn. Liege; Tula Arsenal
- Produced: 1851–1873
- No. built: 272,000
- Variants: Squareback trigger guard Navy, serial number 1 - c. 4200

Specifications
- Mass: 2.6 lb (1.2 kg)
- Length: 13 in (330 mm)
- Barrel length: 7.5 in (190 mm)
- Cartridge: .38 rimfire / .38 centerfire (conversions)
- Caliber: .36
- Action: Single-action
- Muzzle velocity: 840 ft/s (256 m/s)

The Colt Revolving Belt Pistol or Navy Pistol, sometimes erroneously referred to as "Colt Revolving Belt Pistol of Naval Caliber" or "of Navy Caliber," (Note: Naval is heavy gun and Navy Size Caliber was termed later for another Colt mode) is a .36 caliber, six-round cap and ball revolver that was designed by Samuel Colt between 1847 and 1850. Colt first referred to this Revolver as the Ranger Size model, and then the Revolving Belt, but the designation "Navy" quickly took over.

After the Civil War, revolvers using fixed metallic cartridges came into widespread use. The Colt Navy remained in production until 1873, being replaced in the Colt line with what would become one of the manufacturer's most famous handguns, the Colt Single Action Army (also known as the Peacemaker and Colt 45).

Total production numbers of the Colt 1851 Navy Revolver were exceeded only by the Colt Pocket models in concurrent development, and numbered some 215,000 domestic units and about 42,000 produced in the Colt London Armory.

== Characteristics ==
The six-round .36-caliber Navy revolver was much lighter than the contemporary Colt Dragoon Revolvers developed from the .44 Colt Walker revolvers of 1847, which, given their size and weight, were generally carried in saddle holsters. It was an enlarged version of the .31-caliber Colt Pocket Percussion Revolvers, that evolved from the earlier Baby Dragoon, and, like them, was a mechanically improved and simplified descendant of the 1836 Paterson revolver. As the factory designation implied, the Navy revolver was suitably sized for carrying in a belt holster. It became very popular in North America during the Western expansion. Colt's aggressive promotions distributed the Navy and his other revolvers across Europe, Asia, and Africa.

The cylinder of this revolver is engraved with a scene of the victory of the Second Texas Navy at the Battle of Campeche on May 16, 1843. The Texas Navy had purchased the earlier Colt Paterson Revolver, but this was Colt's first major success in the gun trade; the naval theme of the engraved cylinder of the Colt 1851 Navy revolver was Colt's gesture of appreciation. The engraving was provided by Waterman Ormsby. Despite the "Navy" designation, the revolver was chiefly purchased by civilians and military land forces.

The .36-caliber (0.375–0.380-inch [9.5–9.7 mm]) round lead ball weighs 80 grains and, at a velocity of 1,000 feet (300 m) per second, is comparable to the modern .380 pistol cartridge in power. Loads consist of loose powder and ball or bullet, metallic foil cartridges (early), and combustible paper cartridges (Civil War era), all of which are ignited by a fulminate percussion cap applied to the nipples at the rear of the chambers.

A very small number of Navy revolvers were produced in .34 caliber, and are so marked. Another rarity in the 1851 Navy production is the .40-caliber model; only 5 were made in 1858 for testing by the U.S. Navy Bureau of Ordnance.

Identifying features of the First Model Squareback (Serial 1 to ~1250) are the wedge screw beneath the wedge and the wedge notch on top of the cylinder pin (Photo Serial No. 2).

Sighting consists of a tapered brass cone front sight pressed into the muzzle end of the top barrel flat with a notch in the top of the hammer, as with most Colt percussion revolvers. In spite of the relative crudity of the sighting arrangement, these original revolvers are generally quite accurate. However, the same cannot always be said for the reproductions.

== Colt 1851 Navy conversions ==
The first metallic cartridge revolver made by Colt was the Thuer-Conversion Model Revolver, a design that did not require a cylinder with cylindrical chambers to avoid infringing on the Rollin White patent. A small number (about 1000–1500) of Model 1851 Navy revolvers were converted, using front-loaded, slightly tapered cartridges to fit the cylinder chambers, which were reamed to a slight taper.

After the expiration of the Rollin White patent (April 3, 1869), Colt 1851 (and 1861 Navy) Revolvers were converted or newly made to fire .38 rimfire or centerfire cartridges, the Colt Model 1851 Richards- Mason Conversion by the Colt factory.

== Use ==
Famous "Navy" users included Wild Bill Hickok, William Buffalo Bill Cody, John Henry "Doc" Holliday, Richard Francis Burton, Ned Kelly, Bully Hayes, Ben Pease, Blackbirders, Metis, Seth Kinman, Emir Abdelkader, Boer Commando, Bushrangers, Cowboys, Richard H. Barter, Charlie Goodnight, Robert E. Lee, Nathan B. Forrest, John O'Neill, John O'Mahony, Frank Gardiner, Ulysses S. Grant, Quantrill's Raiders, Tom Bell, Kootenay Brown, Ivan Turchin, John Coffee "Jack" Hays, "Bigfoot" Wallace, Frederick Townsend Ward, Ben McCulloch, Robert Addison Gillespie, John "Rip" Ford, "Sul" Ross and most Texas Rangers prior to the Civil War. Use continued long after more modern cartridge revolvers were introduced.

The Ottoman Empire used the revolver as late as the Russo-Turkish War of 1877–78, even though it was quite antiquated compared to the Russians' Smith & Wesson Model 3.

Fictional movie character The Man With No Name also uses a Navy conversion in The Good, the Bad and the Ugly.

== Gallery ==
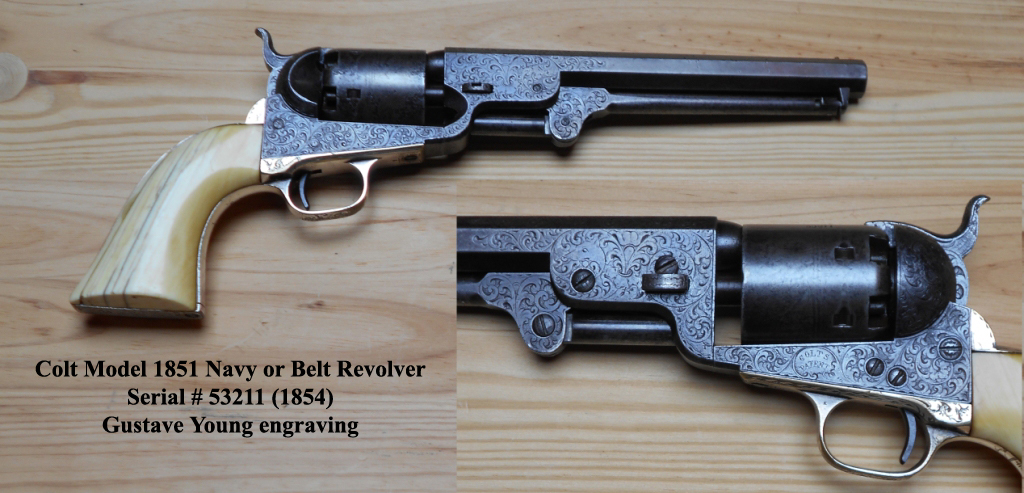
Colt Navy 51
Gustav Young engraving

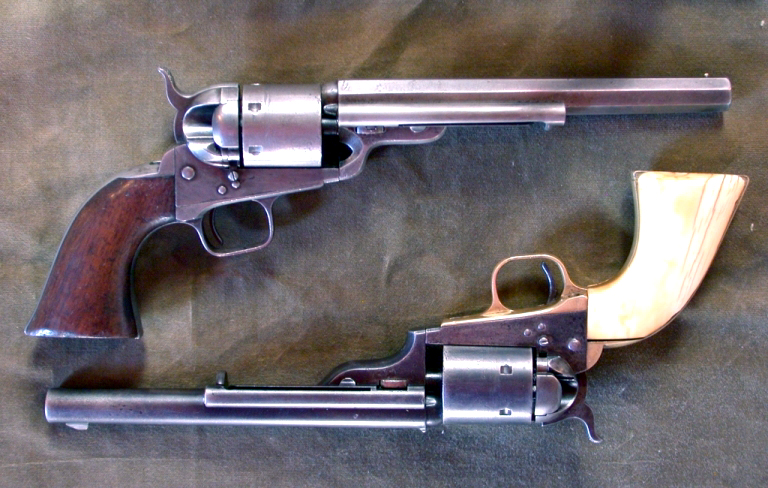
Top: Navy 51 .38 Conversion
Below: Colt Open Top

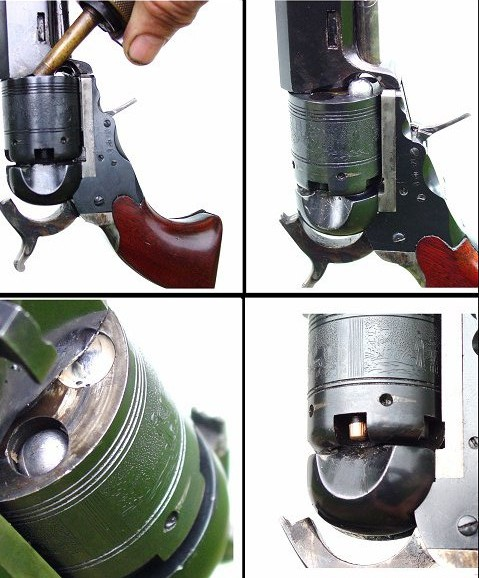
Loading sequence
percussion revolvers

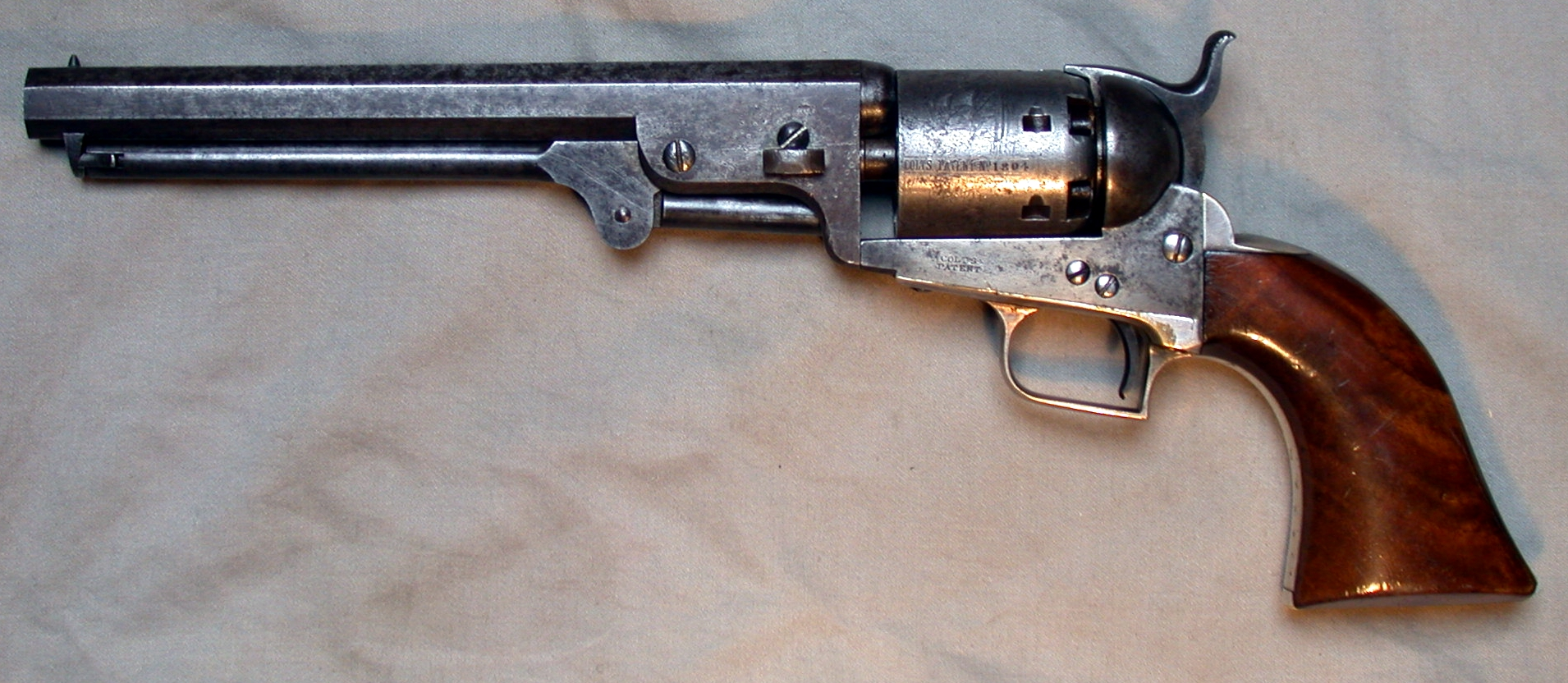
Early Colt Navy Mod 1851
Second Model squareback trigger guard

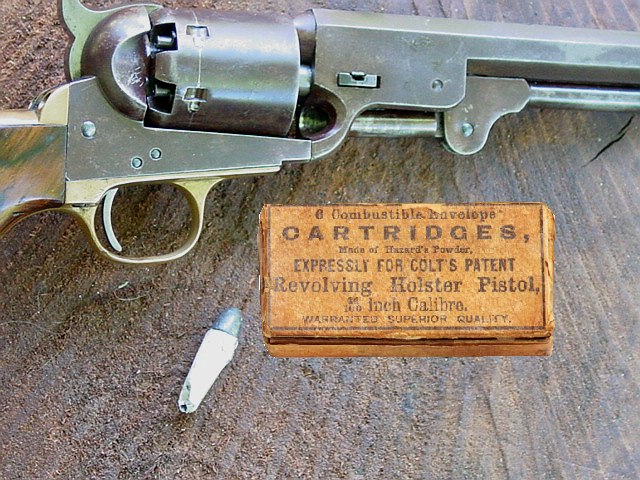
Combustible paper cartridges
six to a box

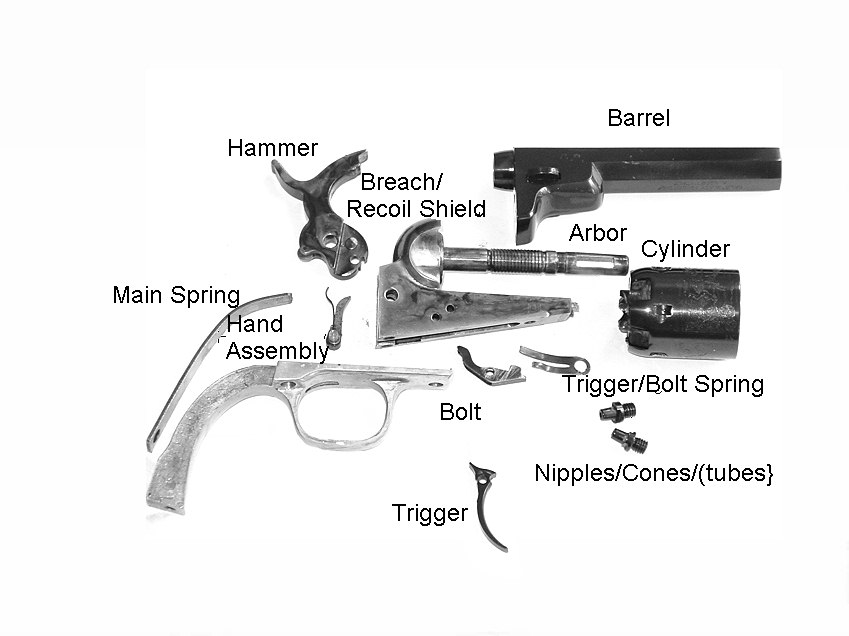
Post 1851 Colt Revolvers

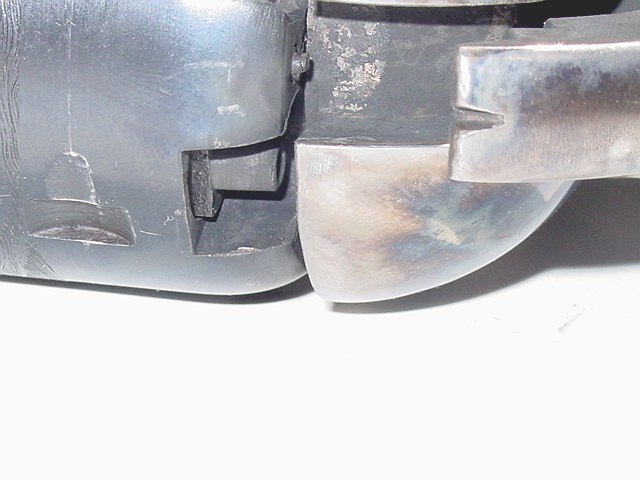
Safety peg between
cylinder chambers
