= Colt Paterson =

1836 revolver by Samuel Colt

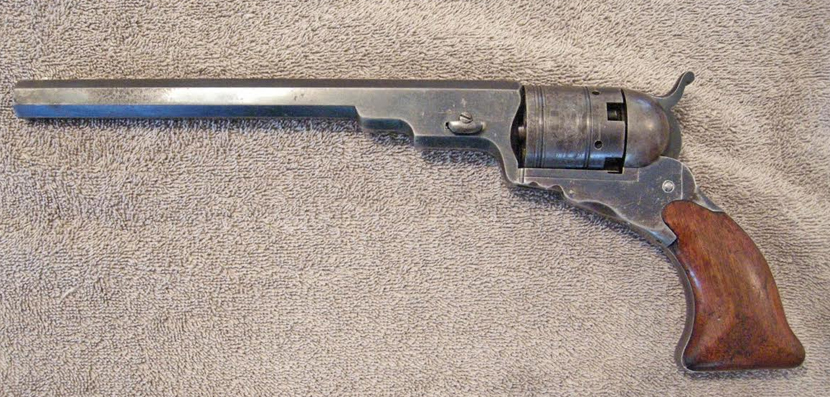
- Colt Holster Model Paterson Revolver No. 5
- Type: Revolver
- Place of origin: United States

Service history
- In service: 1836–1865
- Used by: United States; Republic of Texas; Confederate States of America
- Wars: Seminole Wars; Texas–Indian Wars; Mexican–American War; Texan Revolution; American Civil War (later models)

Production history
- Designer: Samuel Colt
- Designed: 1836; 190 years ago
- Manufacturer: Patent Arms Company, Paterson, New Jersey
- Produced: 1836–1842
- No. built: ~2,800
- Variants: Different calibers, sizes and configurations

Specifications
- Mass: 2 lb 12 oz (1.2 kg levered model)
- Length: 13.75 in (34.9 cm) (Texas model)
- Barrel length: 7.5 in (19 cm)
- Caliber: .28 to .36 inch ball, revolver
- Action: Single-action
- Muzzle velocity: 900 ft/s (270 m/s)
- Effective firing range: 65 yd (59 m)
- Feed system: Five-round cylinder
- Sights: Blade front sight, hammer notch rear sight

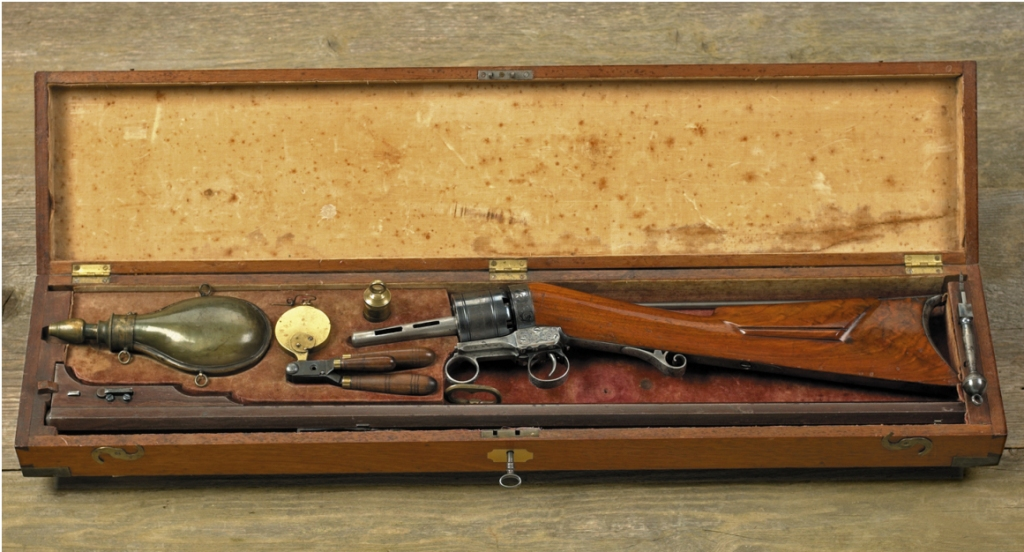
Second Model 1838 Colt Paterson rifle

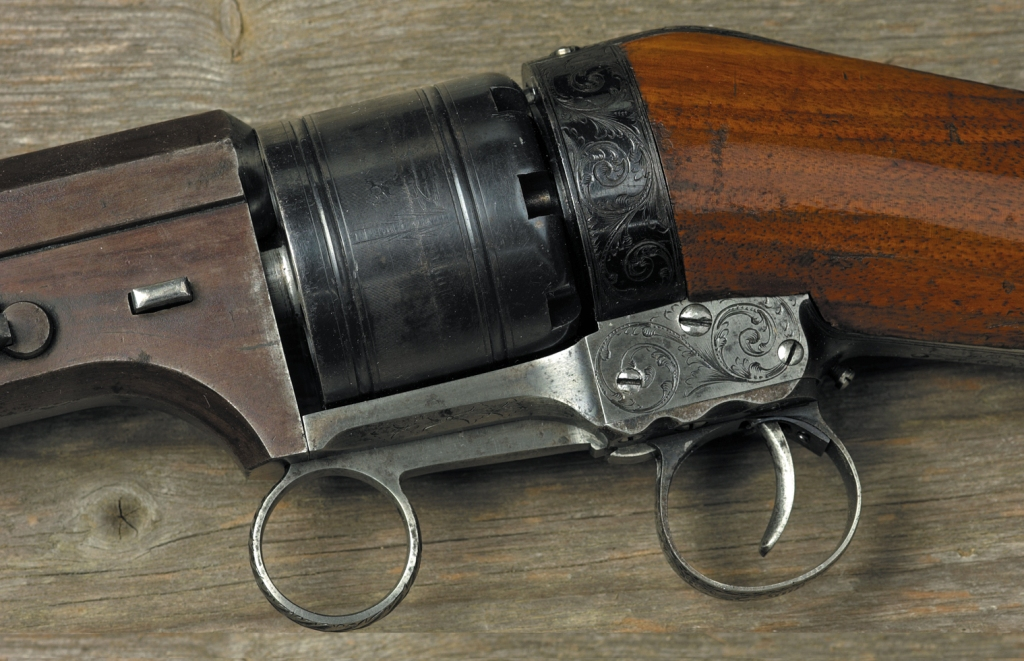
Colt Paterson 1838 Ring Lever rifle, receiver

The Colt Paterson revolver was the first commercial repeating firearm employing a revolving cylinder with multiple chambers aligned with a single, stationary barrel. Its design was patented by Samuel Colt on February 25, 1836, in the United States, England and France, and it derived its name from being produced in Paterson, New Jersey. Initially this 5 shot revolver was produced in .28 caliber, with a .36 caliber model following a year later. As originally designed and produced, no loading lever was included with the revolver; a user had to partially disassemble the revolver to re-load it. Starting in 1839, a reloading lever and a capping window were incorporated into the design, allowing reloading without disassembly. This loading lever and capping window design change was also incorporated after the fact into most Colt Paterson revolvers that had been produced from 1836 until 1839. Unlike later revolvers, a folding trigger was incorporated into the Colt Paterson. The trigger became visible only upon cocking the hammer.

A subsequent patent renewal in 1849, and aggressive litigation against infringements, gave Colt a domestic monopoly on revolver development until the mid 1850s.

== History ==
Early Colt literature and later publications insist that Colt was inspired to design the revolver in 1830 by viewing the windlass mechanisms aboard the brig Corvo while bound from Boston to Calcutta. However, some believe he saw examples of the Collier Flintlock Revolver while touring the Tower of London after the Corvo docked on the River Thames. In any event, sometime while aboard the Corvo he produced a wooden model (the model is exhibited at the Wadsworth Atheneum, Hartford, Connecticut) and further developed the concept during the early 1830s.

Samuel Colt's first factory, the Patent Arms Company (Plant ruins site at 40°55′01.04″N 74°10′44.48″W) of Paterson, New Jersey, manufactured 1,450 revolving rifles and carbines, 462 revolving shotguns and 2,350 revolving pistols between 1836 and 1842, when the business failed. A creditor and business associate, John Ehlers, continued manufacture and sale of (approximately 500 of the total 2,850) pistols through 1847. Revolving pistols held five shots and varied from "pocket" to "belt" and "holster" designations based upon size and intended mode of carry. Calibers ranged from .28 through .36 inches. The model most identified with the "Paterson Colt" designation is the Number 5 Holster or Texas Paterson (1,000 units), which was manufactured in .36 caliber.

== Operation ==
The early Colt revolvers were of single-action design, meaning that the trigger functioned when the hammer was cocked back. It was necessary to manually cock the hammer prior to firing. The close clearances, folding trigger and multiplicity of small parts and springs seemed more appropriate to a fine timepiece than a tool destined for field service and fouling from black powder residue.

The first Paterson Models (1836–1838) required partial disassembly for loading and had no definitive provision for safely carrying the revolver with all chambers loaded. To load the revolver, the shooter would:

1. Draw the hammer to half-cock to free the cylinder for removal and rotation,
2. Push the barrel wedge from right to left until it stops against a retaining screw,
3. Pull the barrel and then the cylinder off the central arbor,
4. Fill the individual chambers with powder leaving enough room to seat a lead ball,
5. Using a special lever tool or the arbor, seat balls beneath the chamber mouths.
6. Replace the barrel, cylinder and wedge and with the hammer at half cock, place percussion caps on each tube using the Colt designed capping tool. The revolvers came with spare cylinders, and the practice of the day was to carry spare cylinders loaded and capped for fast reloading. Period users had few qualms about this practice even though it presented a real hazard of accidental discharge if the caps were struck or the cylinder dropped.

Routine carry modes included leaving the hammer in the half-cock position, lowering the hammer to rest on a capped chamber, downloading by one cylinder, or lowering the hammer between the chambers of the cylinder. The first two options were (and are) extremely dangerous. Later Colt revolvers had a notched hammer that would fit over an intermediate safety pin located between chambers of the cylinder on the back of the chamber when all cylinders were loaded, thereby obviating contact of the hammer with the percussion caps until the single-action hammer was intentionally cocked.

In 1839, a hinged loading lever and capping window became standard for new revolvers and was retrofitted to the older designs. So modified, the revolvers could be loaded without disassembly. When the Paterson revolvers with loading levers finally reached Texas in 1842, Texas Ranger Captain John Coffee Hays was very pleased that his ranging companies could now reload from horseback.

== Handling and shooting characteristics ==
To fire the Paterson, the shooter thumbed the hammer back and the action rotated a chamber in line with the barrel and locked the cylinder in place. This also caused the folding trigger to drop down from the frame into firing position. The sight picture consists of a front blade and a notch in the tip of the hammer. This sequence is repeated for each of the five shots in the cylinder (although the safety-conscious shooter will load only four, leaving the hammer down on an empty chamber for routine handling and carry.)

Compared to the later Colt Percussion Revolver designs, the Paterson is ergonomically flawed, but, even with the odd bell-shaped grip and jutting trigger, the revolver points reasonably well and delivers useful accuracy. That Samuel Colt intended the revolver to be accurate is evident because of the rifled barrel and the extra long accessory barrels present in some cased sets. Using modern-day Uberti replicas, the usual expectation is that careful, one-handed shooting will produce groups of 2–3 in (5.1–7.6 cm) at 60 ft (18 m).

The Number 5 Belt Revolver would be an effective weapon to 50 yd (46 m) with ideal shooting conditions; however, from a moving horse, the useful range would be measured in feet.

The available power is comparable to a modern .380 pistol cartridge. The .375–.380-inch round ball weighs a near-identical 83 grains (5.4 g) and the velocity is also essentially the same.

The cylinder is somewhat shorter than that found on the later Colt Navy .36 revolvers but will hold 22 gr (1.4 g) of FFFg black powder while allowing full seating of the ball.

Paterson With Loading Lever
Gunpowder	Velocity	Deviation
22 grains (1.4 g) Goex Brand FFFg	879 feet per second (268 m/s)	37 ft/s (11 m/s) extreme spread
90-year-old FFFg from cartridges	943 feet per second (287 m/s)	75 ft/s (23 m/s) extreme spread

== Military acceptance ==
Capt. John Coffee "Jack" Hays of the Texas Rangers

Colt sold the Paterson revolver and carbine to the United States Army and they saw limited use in the Second Seminole War in Florida. The firepower advantage that they offered was initially praised by the troops, but the United States government considered the arms to be excessively fragile and prone to malfunction.

The Republic of Texas purchased 180 of the revolving shotguns and rifles and a like number of handguns for the Texas Navy in 1839.

When Samuel Houston disbanded the Texas Navy in 1843, Captain Jack Hays armed his company of Texas Rangers with surplus stocks of the pistols. The repeating handguns became very popular with the Rangers, providing them with sustained firepower against their Comanche adversaries.

The Paterson revolver was especially decisive in the Battle of Bandera Pass, where each Ranger had 10 shots at his disposal when armed with two pistols as opposed to one. Captains Jack Hays and Samuel Walker of the Texas Rangers became major proponents of the Colt revolvers and were successful in advocating military contracts for later models such as the Walker Colt.

Zachary Taylor, as a general in command of the border with Mexico, sent Captain Walker to New York in 1846 to meet with Colt and discuss improvements to the Paterson to make it more appropriate for use in battle. Walker at the time was serving in the U.S. Mounted Rifles and not the Rangers.

== Gallery ==
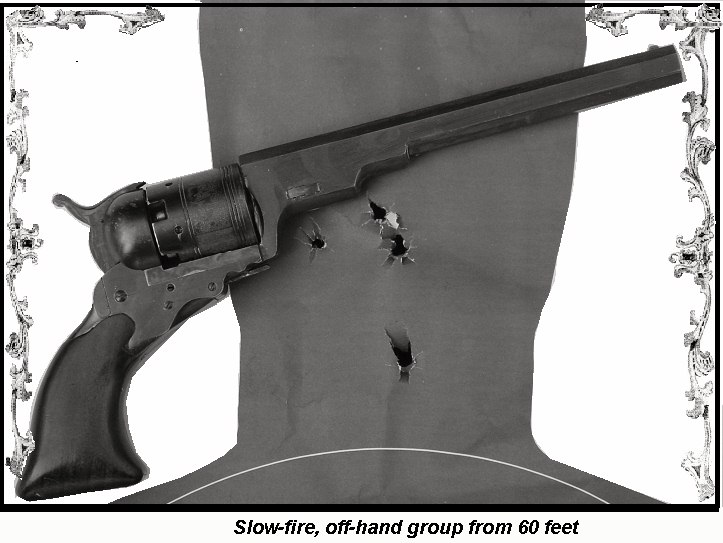
Slow-fire off-hand group from 60 feet (18 m)

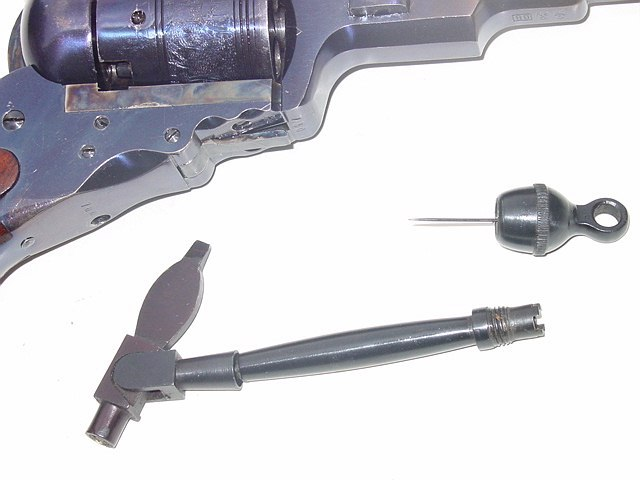
Combination tool including seating stem/lever, nipple pick, nipple wrench, screwdriver

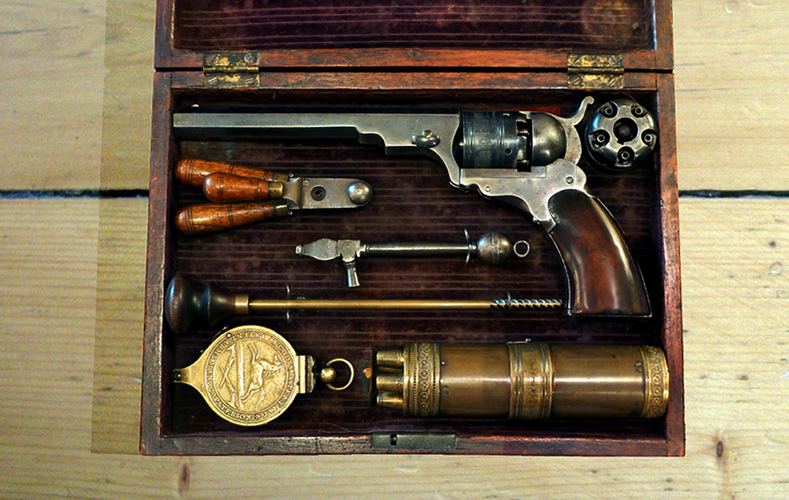
Colt Paterson 2nd Belt Model

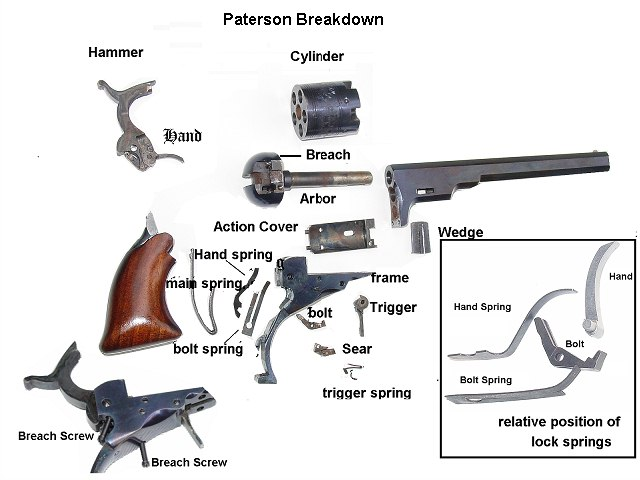
Exploded diagram of the Paterson Colt revolver showing internal mechanisms with cylinder reversed

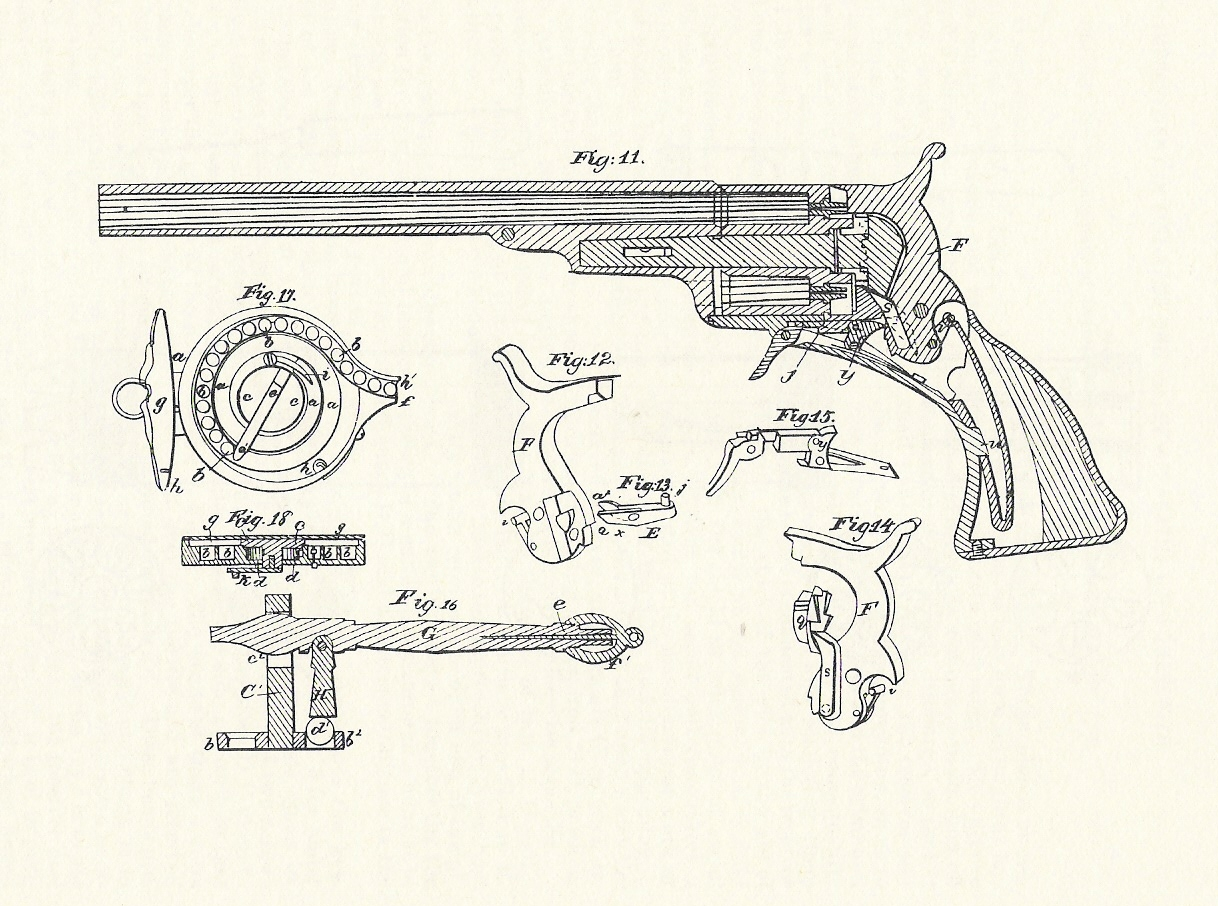
Patent illustrations of the Colt Paterson "Holster Model"

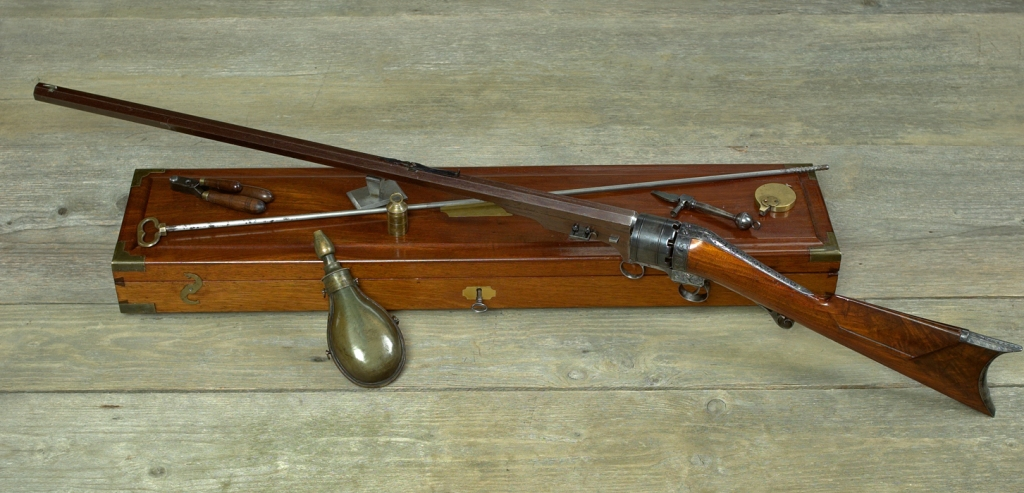
Colt Paterson 1838 rifle

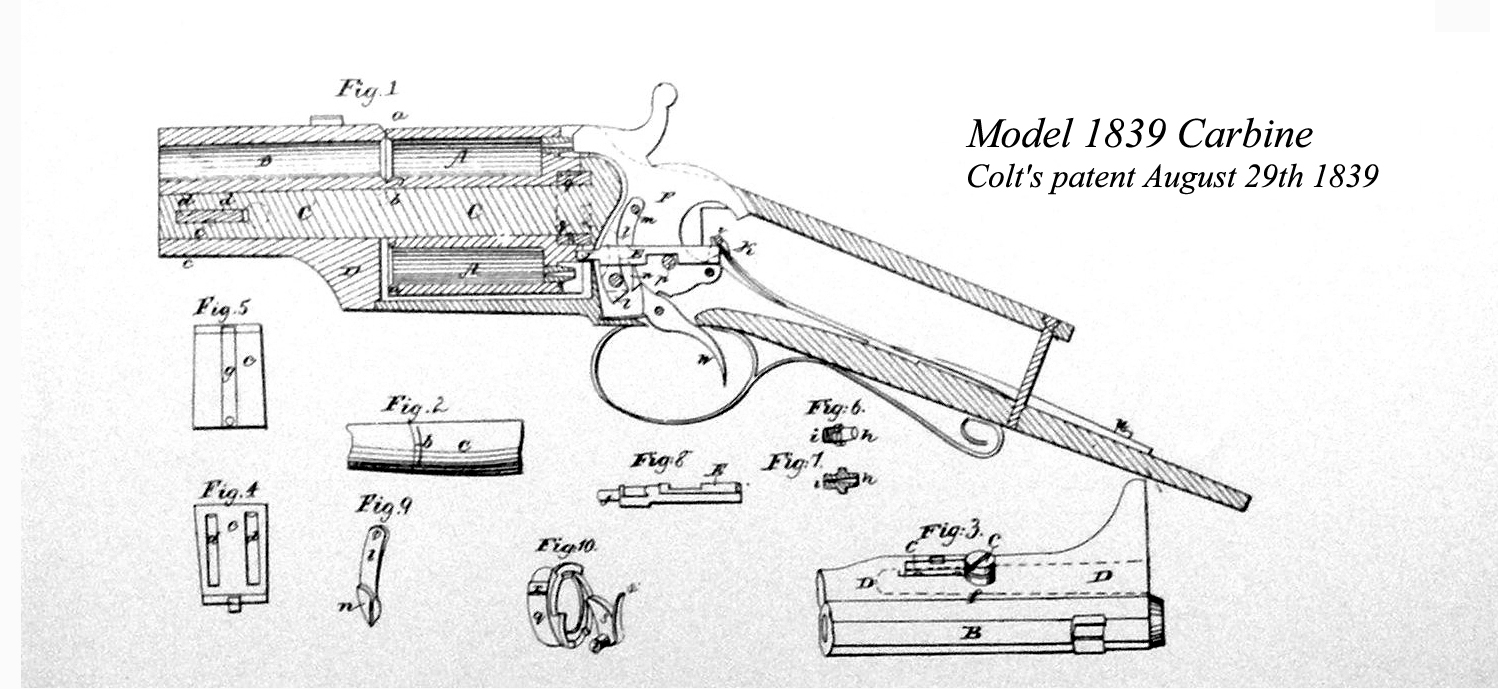
Patent drawing Paterson Model 1839 carbine
