= .45 Black Powder Magnum =

Black-powder firearm round

.45 Black Powder Magnum (.45 BPM)
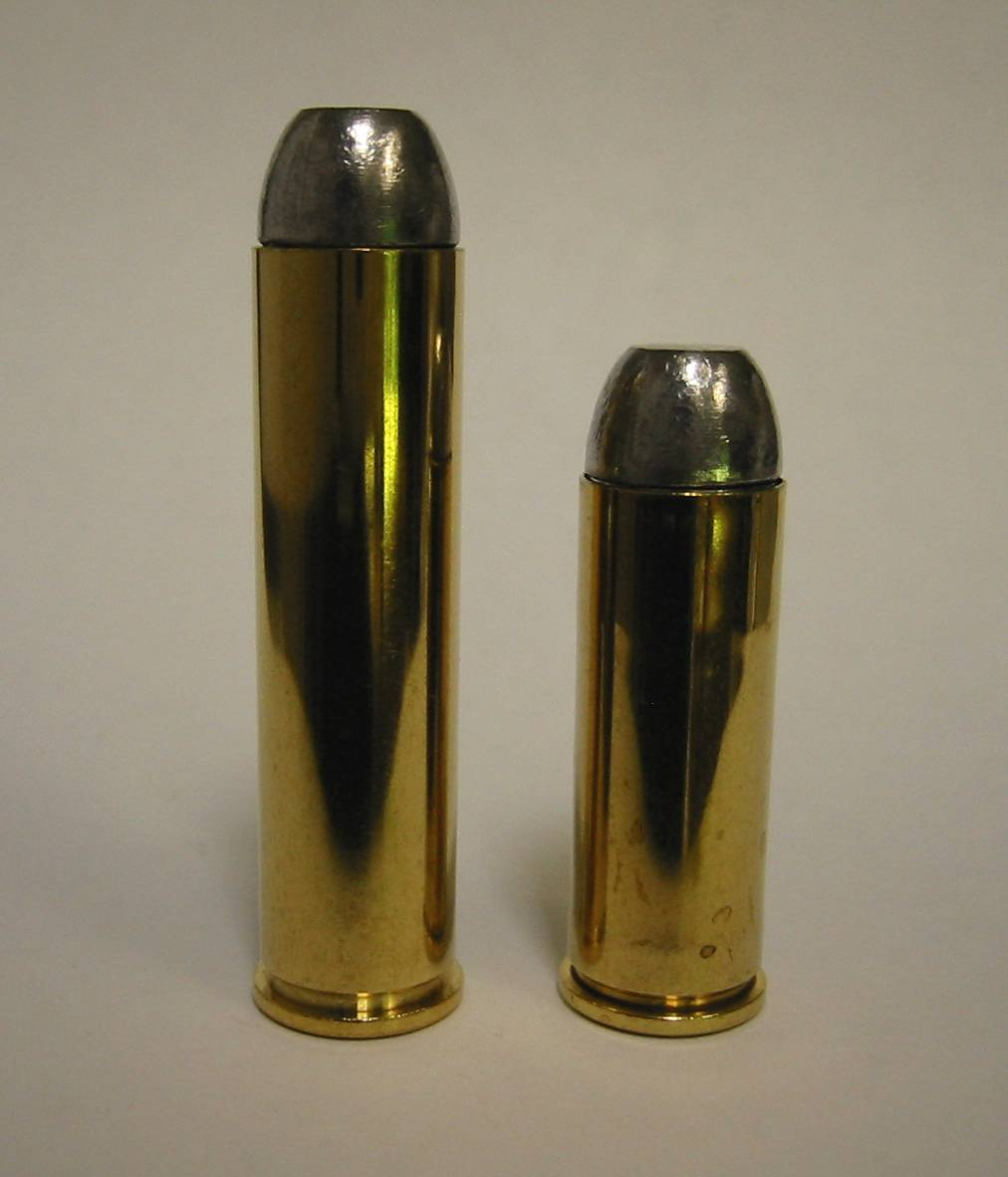
- .45 BPM (left) next to .45 Colt (right)
- Type: Revolver
- Place of origin: United States

Production history
- Designer: Dieska
- Designed: 2010
- Produced: 2010–present

Specifications
- Parent case: .460 S&W Magnum
- Case type: Rimmed, straight
- Bullet diameter: .452 (soft lead)
- Neck diameter: .478 in (12.1 mm)
- Base diameter: .478 in (12.1 mm)
- Rim diameter: .520 in (13.2 mm)
- Rim thickness: .059 in (1.5 mm)
- Case length: 1.800 in (45.7 mm)
- Overall length: 2.140 in (54.4 mm)
- Primer type: Large pistol

Ballistic performance
Bullet mass/type	Velocity	Energy
250 gr (16 g) PRS 0.452 BigLube 48gr Goex FFFg	1,032 ft/s (315 m/s)	591 ft⋅lbf (801 J)
200 gr (13 g) J/P 0.452 BigLube 52gr Goex FFFg	1,161 ft/s (354 m/s)	598 ft⋅lbf (811 J)
150 gr (10 g) EPP 0.452 BigLube 60gr Goex FFFg	1,306 ft/s (398 m/s)	568 ft⋅lbf (770 J)
141 gr (9 g) Hornady 0.454 Roundball 60gr Goex FFFg	1,304 ft/s (397 m/s)	532 ft⋅lbf (721 J)

The .45 Black Powder Magnum (also known as .45 BPM and .45-55 Walker) is a black-powder firearm round. It is a wildcat cartridge of the .45 Colt family.

== Overview ==
The .45 BPM was originally developed for use in replica Colt Walker black powder revolvers. Specifically, Colt Walker replicas that have been converted to allow the use of firearm cartridges by incorporation of a "converter cylinder". A. Uberti Firearms is one such company that manufactures replica revolvers.

The Colt Walker was the largest and most powerful black-powder revolver ever produced. Because its cylinder could hold 60 grains of black powder in each of its six chambers it is widely regarded as the world's first magnum revolver. The Colt Walker was unsurpassed in power by any commercially-manufactured repeating handgun from its introduction in 1847 until the arrival of the .357 Magnum in 1935. Samuel Colt, with suggestions from Captain Samuel H. Walker, designed it as a "cap and ball" revolver to shoot both lead round balls and picket bullets. This was prior to the development of self-contained cartridges as used in most modern firearms today. As such, an unconverted Colt Walker is a front loading percussion revolver.

After the introduction of the .45 Colt cartridge, in 1873, the conversion of .44 caliber percussion revolvers began. Percussion cylinders were replaced with rear loading cartridge cylinders. This allowed the use of the .45 Colt cartridge. The load range for this cartridge was typically 28 to 40 grains of black powder. Thus, a Colt Walker revolver converted to shoot the .45 Colt cartridge is limited to a maximum of 40 grains, even though the revolver was originally designed to load up to 60 grains. The .45 BPM cartridge was developed to allow for black-powder loads of more than 40 grains. This gives the converted Colt Walker the convenience of using self-contained cartridges and the advantage of loads beyond the 40 grain limitation of the .45 Colt cartridge and provides the added benefit of moving the bullet closer to the forcing cone as compared to the .45 Colt. This can potentially improve accuracy by reducing "bullet jump".

The .45 BPM can hold up to 60 grains of black powder. A 60 grain cartridge configuration may be desirable to use as a novelty rifle cartridge such as for a lever-action carbine.

== Design ==
The .45 BPM uses the .460 S&W Magnum brass casing as its container. The .460 S&W Magnum was derived from the .454 Casull while the .454 Casull was derived from the .45 Colt. Because of this lineage the .460 S&W Magnum has similar dimensional attributes to the .45 Colt with the exception of a much longer casing. As such, revolvers chambered to .460 S&W Magnum will usually chamber the shorter .45 Colt. The reverse, however, is not true as most .45 Colt revolver cylinders are not long enough to chamber the .460 S&W Magnum cartridge. Two examples of the exception to this rule are the Colt Walker and the Taurus Judge. However, it is standard practice to rebate the inside of a revolver's chambers only to a depth equal to the targeted cartridge's length. This prevents either accidental or intentional loading of longer but unsafe cartridges in firearms not designed for or tested for more powerful cartridges.

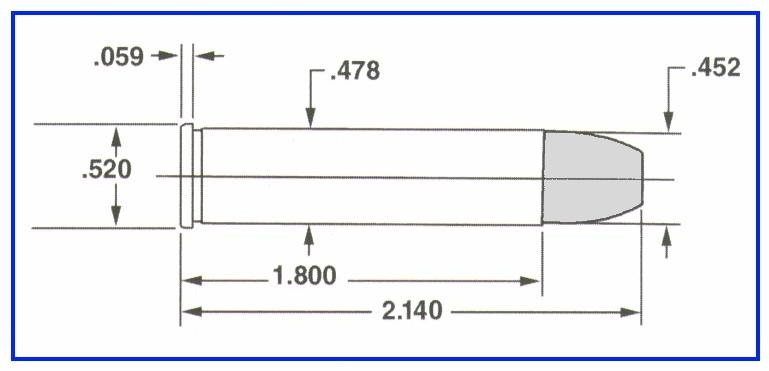
Diagram of the .45 BPM, maximum dimensions shown

Since the .45 BPM is much longer than a .45 Colt cartridge a Colt Walker converted for .45 Colt cartridges will typically not chamber a .45 BPM. Again, this is because of the rebated internal design of the chambers as described previously. Therefore, the chambers of a Colt Walker conversion cylinder must be reamed to deepen them to the length of the .45 BPM casing. Any attempt to chamber a .460 S&W Magnum cartridge in a firearm not designed, tested, and certified for it is unsafe and should never be attempted. The .45 BPM is not a .460 S&W Magnum. The .45 BPM differs from the .460 S&W Magnum in several key areas. First, the .45 BPM is limited to a maximum C.O.L. (Cartridge Overall Length) of 2.140" whereas the .460 S&W Magnum has a C.O.L. of 2.290". Second, the .45 BPM is a black-powder cartridge and can only contain either FFg or FFFg rated black powder. .460 S&W Magnum cartridges contain smokeless powder which generates pressures unsafe in firearms not designed for it including replica Colt Walkers. Third, the .45 BPM uses a large pistol primer whereas the .460 S&W Magnum uses a large rifle primer.

== Handloading ==
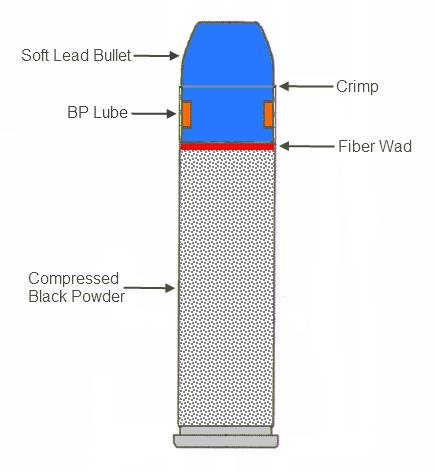
Cross section of typical .45 BPM load

Typical wildcatting modification methods are not necessary for the .45 BPM cartridge. A standard unmodified .460 S&W Magnum brass casing is used. The brass casing must adhere to specifications of the .460 S&W Magnum.

The .45 BPM can be handloaded using a .460 S&W Magnum brass casing, a standard large pistol primer, from 40 grains black powder with filler as necessary to avoid air gaps on up to 60 grains black powder. A typical bullet would consist of soft lead from 150 to 250 grains in weight with a black powder appropriate lubricant in the groove(s).

Gallery loads using a 0.454" diameter 141 grain lead round ball may also be suitable for some applications. Crimping the case around the round ball may be necessary to prevent ball movement during recoil.

As with most firearm cartridges, the .45 BPM can be loaded in a variety of configurations. A minimal 40 grain load of black powder is recommended as this is the upper limit of the .45 Colt cartridge. However, this does not necessarily preclude the use of smaller black-powder loads. As with any black-powder load there should never be an air gap between the powder and the bullet. An air gap can cause a dangerous pressure spike condition causing bursting of the chamber, cylinder, or barrel. Various filler materials such as corn meal, fiber wads, or felt wads can be used to take up space not used by the black powder nor bullet. The C.O.L. can not exceed 2.140".

=== Example loads ===
Some load configurations may be neither suitable nor safe in certain firearms converted to .45 BPM. Increased powder loads in combination with increased bullet weight may create dangerous pressure conditions. The following are example loads only. The examples do not indicate they are safe as only a firearms inspection by a certified and licensed gunsmith can determine which load configurations are safe and appropriate.

Bullet Weight	Bullet Type	Powder Type	Powder Charge	Compression	Drop Tube	Filler	Fiber Wad(s)
250 grains	0.452 PRS BigLube	Goex FFFg	48 grains	0.300"	No	7 grains	2 x 0.030"
200 grains	0.452 J/P BigLube	Goex FFFg	52 grains	0.125"	No	None	0.030"
150 grains	0.452 EPP BigLube	Goex FFFg	55 grains	0.125"	No	None	0.030"
150 grains	0.452 EPP BigLube	Goex FFFg	60 grains	0.200"	24"	None	0.030"
141 grains	0.454 Roundball	Goex FFFg	60 grains	0.150"	24"	None	0.030"

== See also ==
- List of handgun cartridges
- Wildcat cartridge
