= Shang Stanton =

Notorious 19-century American gambler and gunfighter

Charles "Shang" Stanton (died 1889) was a gambler of the American frontier, whose killing of Slim Jim Shumway on April 25, 1872 provided the impetus for establishing Clay County, Minnesota government in Moorhead, Minnesota. Stanton's real name was Edward Stanton Curran, and after his death he was remembered as a gambler, statuesque, "a rounder," and infinitely devoted to his wife and young children.

== Character ==
Stanton was only a youth when he first went to work in railroad construction. He initially became known as a pugilist; "experience which made him stand high in the respect of everybody in those then un-terrified regions." Once the Union Pacific Railroad was completed, Stanton went to work on the Northern Pacific Railway, making his first fortune as a gambler in the Black Hills. During this time an article in the Baltimore Bee described Stanton:

The life of a professional gambler is indeed a peculiar one. I have seen "Shang" Stanton start with a $10 note and come out with over $2,200. In less than six hours afterward I found him just as jolly as ever, but without a dime in his pocket, and all of his jewelry, including a $400 watch and chain, "Spouted." During the past six weeks he must have won fully $10,000, but his luck is uneven, and when last I saw him he was "flat broke."

== Setting ==
In the spring of 1872, Stanton was a gambler and gunfighter who had gravitated, with many others, to the unfinished western end of the under-construction Northern Pacific Railway. According to pioneer and attorney Solomon Comstock, the terminus of the railroad attracted many unsavory and violent characters. "In the bad old days when Moorhead was a small tent town at track end and when most of the buildings were dance halls, saloons, or gambling houses, the gunman was here too. He followed the track. He boasted that he would die with his boots on and he usually did. The talk of his six shooters was often heard."

== Gunfight with Slim Jim Shumway ==
Stanton and Shumway had had a disagreement in a gambling hall on the evening of April 24, 1872. According to a contemporary report in The Duluth Minnesotian-Herald, "It seems these two men had exchanged some words not intended to be complimentary, and had parted somewhat out of temper." The following morning Shumway, armed with two loaded revolvers, looked for Stanton, and put word out that he intended to demand satisfaction. This word was passed to Stanton, who waited in a saloon. The confrontation between the two men was not a duel. Shumway entered the saloon, approached Stanton from behind, and shoved him. Stanton whirled around, stuck his revolver into Shumway's belly, and fired. Stanton fled, and the mortally wounded Shumway tried to follow, running into the street and firing wildly in all directions. One of Shumway's bullets struck and killed the owner of a neighboring saloon, JP Thompson of the Orleans Club. It was claimed by author Jeanette Prodgers that Stanton had "received a reward of three hundred dollars" for killing Shumway, but no support was given for this assertion.

== Disposition of the Case ==
Following his killing of Shumway, Stanton was arrested by a posse and held for trial. Establishment of a county government had to precede any trial, so on the day of the shooting, Peter Wilson and Andrew Holes were sworn in as County Commissioners, and they in turn appointed Jim Blanchard as county sheriff, Solomon Comstock as county attorney, and David Grant as Justice of the Peace. Though Stanton was eventually released, his handgun, a Colt 1849 Pocket Revolver with a silver finish and a carved solid ivory handle, ended up in the possession of a local Kiefer family. Stanton later relocated to Bismarck, North Dakota, Deadwood, South Dakota, and then Spokane, Washington, where he died in the spring of 1889.

== Legacy ==
Following the announcement of Stanton's death, The Morning Review newspaper of Spokane called him, "a character so well known in the Northwest as to entitle him to more extended mention." The accompanying article went on to explain that Stanton was well known in Minneapolis, Bismarck, and Spokane Falls, it stated that he, "towered above the coterie of lesser lights of the green cloth fraternity," and it mourned the loss of the "noted gambler and adventurer."
