= Colt Dragoon Revolver =

1848 revolver by Samuel Colt

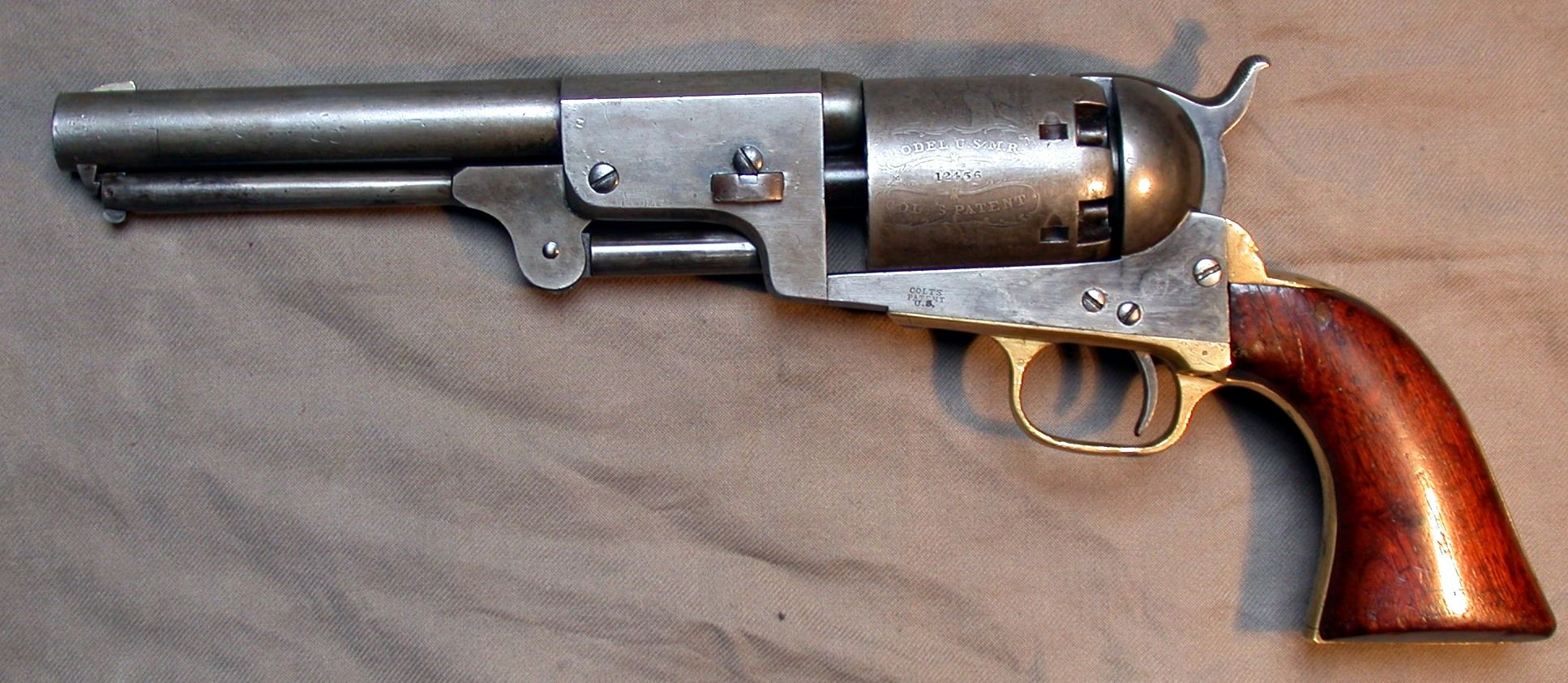
- Third Model Dragoon, U.S. Cavalry issued
- Type: Revolver
- Place of origin: United States

Service history
- In service: 1848–1865
- Used by: United States
- Wars: American Indian Wars, American Civil War

Production history
- Designer: Samuel Colt
- Designed: 1848–1850
- Manufacturer: Colt Firearms
- Produced: 1848–1860
- No. built: About 18,500 in U.S.A.
- Variants: Walker Transitions, First and Second Models

Specifications
- Mass: 4 pounds 4 ounces (1.9 kg)
- Length: 14.75 inches (375 mm)
- Barrel length: 7.5 inches (190 mm)
- Caliber: .44 ball, revolver (.454 in [11.5 mm], dia.)
- Action: Single-action
- Muzzle velocity: 850–1,236 feet (259–377 m) per second depending on powder/projectile
- Effective firing range: 80 yards (70 m)
- Feed system: Six-round cylinder
- Sights: Blade front sight, hammer notch rear sight, some with sight mounted on rear of barrel for use with shoulder stock

The Colt Model 1848 Percussion Army Revolver is a .44 caliber revolver designed by Samuel Colt for the U.S. Army's Regiment of Mounted Rifles. The revolver was also issued to the Army's "Dragoon" regiments. This revolver was designed as a solution to numerous problems encountered with the Colt Walker. Although it was introduced after the Mexican–American War, it became popular among civilians during the 1850s and 1860s and was also used during the American Civil War.

== Production ==
The Colt Dragoon Revolver was produced with several variations between 1847 and 1860, when the Colt Model 1860 revolver replaced it. All the improvements in design of Colt revolvers were applied to the Dragoons as well to the smaller models of Colt revolvers. Total production of Colt Dragoons including the 1,100 Walkers, from 1847 to 1860: 19,800; plus 750 Dragoons in a separate number range for the British market. For collectors, there are three different types with one "transition" model.

=== Whitneyville Hartford Dragoon Revolver ===
Between the Walker and the First model Dragoon, around 240 improved "Whitneyville Dragoons" or "Transitional Dragoons" were produced at the Eli Whitney factory for Colt, having a barrel length of 7 1/2 inches (190 mm) and a cylinder diameter of 2 3/16 inches (56 mm). The cylinder, shorter than the Walker, retained oval cutouts for the bolt. Their general appearance was similar to that of the production Dragoon models. These were produced between late in 1847 and 1848, serial number range approximately 1100 (the last civilian Walker) through about 1340 (the first Dragoon First Model). These are sometimes called "Transitional Dragoon" revolvers, and were made in two frame variations. The earlier pattern was a Walker carry-over with a cut-out in the back to accommodate the round contour of the grips and the second was straight-backed. Another distinctive detail were the very slender "Slim Jim" grips. Note: Due to serial number gaps between the "Transition" model and the First Dragoon, which Colt later "backfilled", as well as the details of the production and delivery of the Second Government Contract, the "fluck Dragoon" was erroneously derived.

=== First Model ===
The First Model Colt Dragoon Revolver production began in 1848, stemming from Colt's Second Government Contract. It has rectangular cylinder stops, a V-type mainspring, no wheel on the rear of the hammer, and a square back trigger guard. Colt produced about 7,000 first models between 1848 and 1850.

=== Second Model ===
The Second Model has rectangular cylinder notches. Until the no. 10,000 the V-shaped mainspring was standard and then replaced with a flat leaf mainspring and a wheel on the hammer at its bearing on the mainspring. All the Second Model Dragoons have the square back trigger guard. The company made about 2,550 Second Models in 1850 and 1851.

=== Third Model ===
The Third Model Dragoon numbers stand at ten-thousand from 1851 through 1860. This design had more variations as compared to its earlier counterparts. Some of the third model Colt Dragoon Revolvers had frame cuts for detachable shoulder stocks, horizontal loading lever latches and folding leaf sights. Third Colt Dragoon Revolvers had a round trigger guard. Government records showed an order for 8,390 Dragoons.

=== 1848 Pocket Pistol ===
Other variants included the Colt "1848 Pocket Pistol" now known as the Baby Dragoon, marketed in California with success during the Gold rush days. With the addition of a loading lever this evolved into the 1849 pocket revolver (see Colt Pocket Percussion Revolvers).

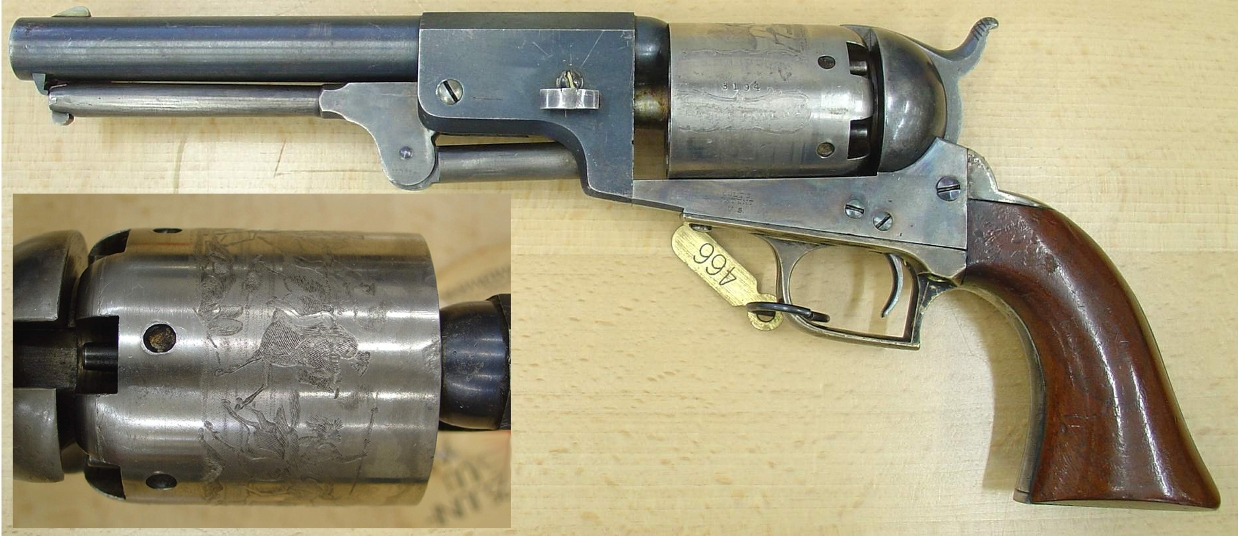
Colt Model of 1848 Holster Pistol (First Model Dragoon), square back trigger guard, oval-shaped Cylinder Stops]

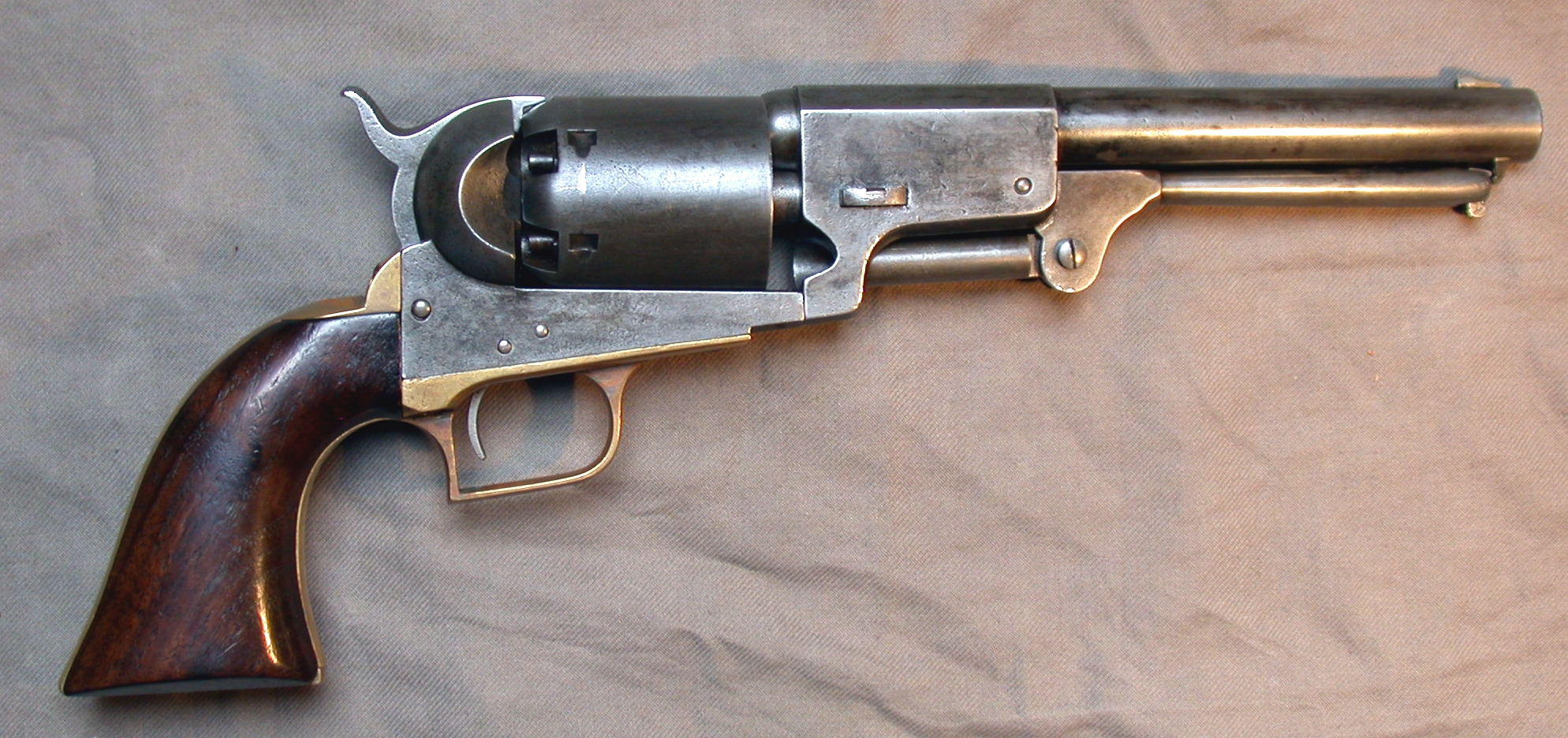
Colt Dragoon 1848 second model, square back trigger guard

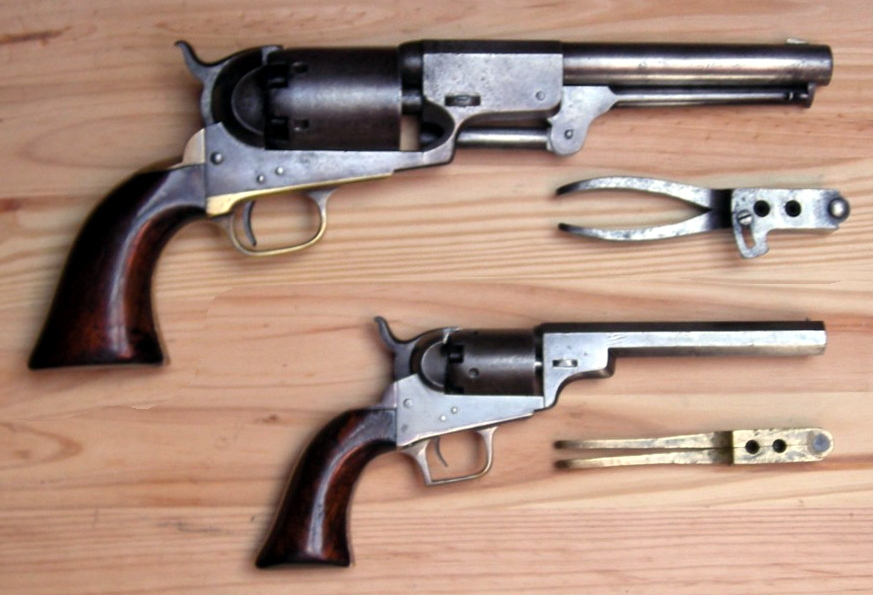
Colt Dragoon 3rd Model, Colt Baby Dragoon 1848 with square back trigger guard

Dragoon bullets

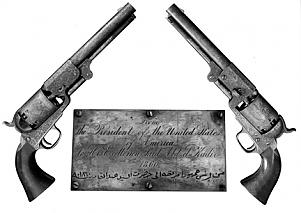
A pair of Colt 1848 Dragoon sent by Abraham Lincoln to Emir Abdelkader for having protected Christians in the 1860 Mount Lebanon civil war.

== Size ==
The Dragoon was produced because of the problems seen with the fielded Colt Walker revolvers, namely, the Walker's heavy weight, four and a half pounds, making it suitable only for use as a saddle-mounted revolver, the Walker's propensity for cylinders exploding on occasion when fired (due to the chambers being loaded with too much powder often in combination with the Pickett bullets being loaded backwards), and the Walker's habit of dropping the loading lever upon discharge, locking up the revolver action in the middle of combat. The Colt Dragoon Revolver had a comparatively shorter cylinder (thus preventing overloading the cylinder) and held up to 50 grains of powder, whereas the Walker had used up to 60 grains of powder. The Dragoon Revolver had a shorter barrel at 7.5 inches (190 mm) (and on some later revolvers, 8 inches [200 mm]) as compared to the 9-inch (230 mm) barrel on the Walker. A loading lever latch in front of the lever replaced the spring to keep the lever from dropping during recoil, thereby preventing jamming of the revolver. These variations gave the Colt Dragoon Revolver a weight of 4 pounds 2 ounces (1.9 kg). These changes also reduced the risk of the Colt Dragoon Revolver exploding when fired, obviating the risk that had been demonstrated with the Walker revolvers.

== Popularity ==
In the events that led to the American Civil War, Colt Dragoons became extremely popular. In the beginning Colt Dragoon Revolvers were issued for the U.S. Army's Mounted Rifles. They were carried in pommel holsters on the saddle. The Colt Dragoon Revolver gained popularity among civilians in the Southwest where many had served in the Mexican–American War. The Dragoon became a master weapon for civilians who hailed it as a powerful weapon of the time.

Famous users included Joaquin Murietta, the California bandit, Charley Parkhurst, California teamster and stagecoach driver, James Douglas Byrd, Town Marshal, Watsonville, California, 1868, Tiburcio Vasquez, Union general George B McClellan, and fictional Augustus McCrae, in the novel Lonesome Dove, Clint Eastwood carried a 3rd Model Dragoon in the movie The Outlaw Josey Wales in addition to Colt Walkers, Mattie Ross in the novel True Grit and in the 2010 film version (the 1969 film of the same name had Mattie using a Colt Walker revolver, though John Wayne's character Rooster referred to it as a Colt's Dragoon). Charley Parkhurst, while driving freight, was confronted by two bandits whom he/she shot with the Colt Holster Pistol. According to Harper's Weekly, James Butler (Wild Bill Hickok) arrived in Springfield, Missouri carrying a Dragoon though it is generally accepted that he used a Colt 1851 Navy Revolver in his street duel with Davis Tutt.

== Present ==
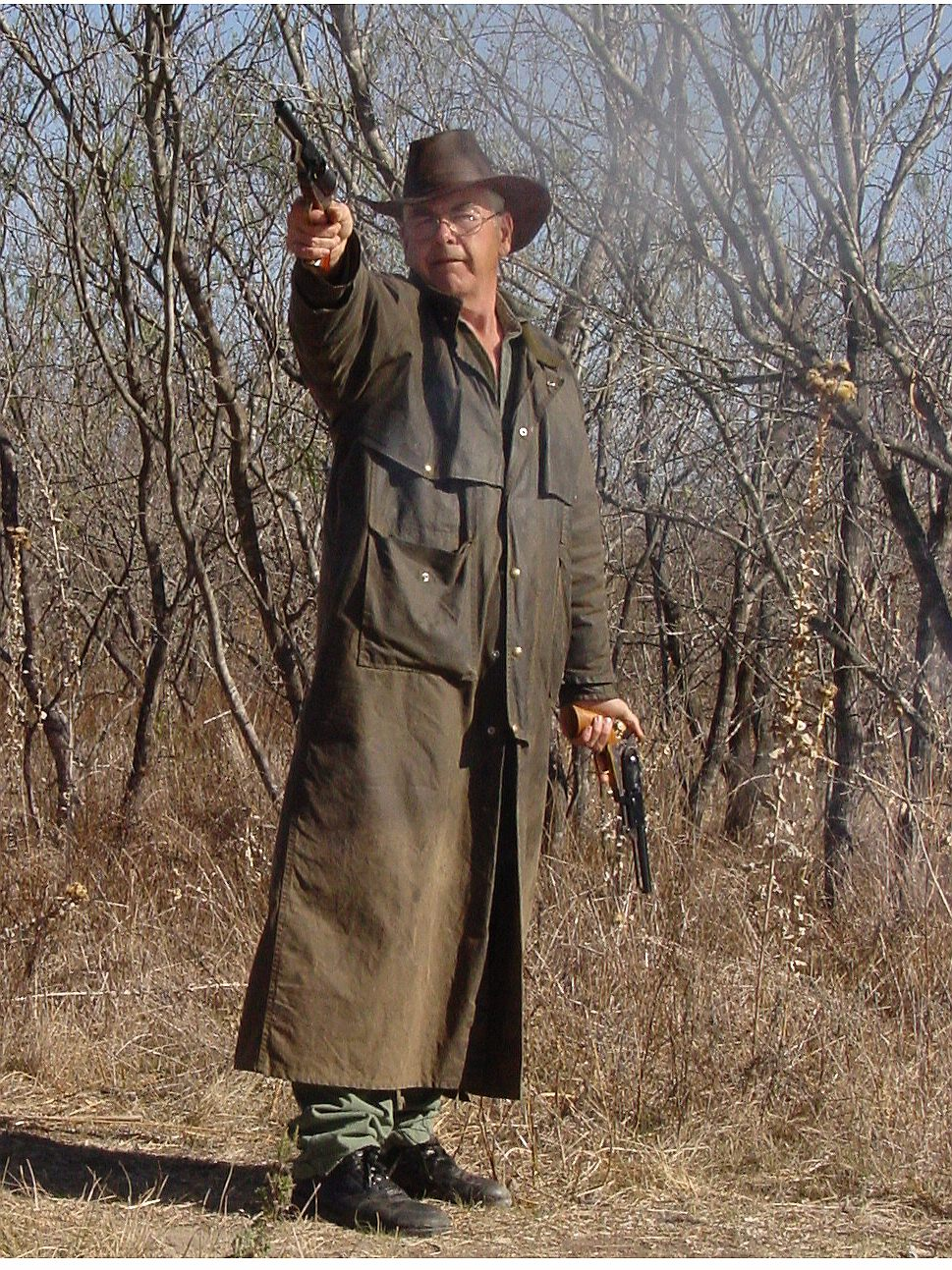
Firing a brace of Dragoons

The Dragoon is now a collectible arm and sells for high prices.

Non-firing replicas of the Colt 1848 Dragoon were manufactured at Denix in Spain. In 2005, a fire burned down the factory and destroyed the mold for the gun, which has since gone out of production. Denix has since reintroduced the non-firing model of the Colt 1848 Dragoon in nickel.

Quality replica Dragoons are currently produced by the Aldo Uberti Company of Brescia, Italy and distributed in the United States by Taylors, Inc.; Cimarron Firearms, and others. They are quite accurate and potentially more powerful than the belt sized revolvers of the same bore diameter. Velocities with .451–.457 inches (11.5–11.6 mm) round balls of approximately 141 grains over the full 50 grains of powder frequently show chronographed readings in the range of 1,000–1,100 feet per second (300–340 m/s), depending upon the powder used.

A cartridge-converted Colt Walker instead of the Colt Dragoon in the book was used in the 1969 film True Grit, as the weapon carried by 14-year-old Mattie, possibly due to the Walker's larger size. The Dragoon was used in the True Grit (2010) as in the original book. In Lonesome Dove, by Larry McMurtry, Captain Gus McCrae is armed with a Colt's Dragoon revolver. In the television adaptation, Gus is armed with a cartridge-converted Colt's Walker revolver.

== See also ==
- Colt's Manufacturing Company – American firearms manufacturer
- Colt Paterson – 1836 revolver by Samuel Colt
- Colt 1851 Navy Revolver – 1851 revolver by Samuel Colt
