= Colt Walker =

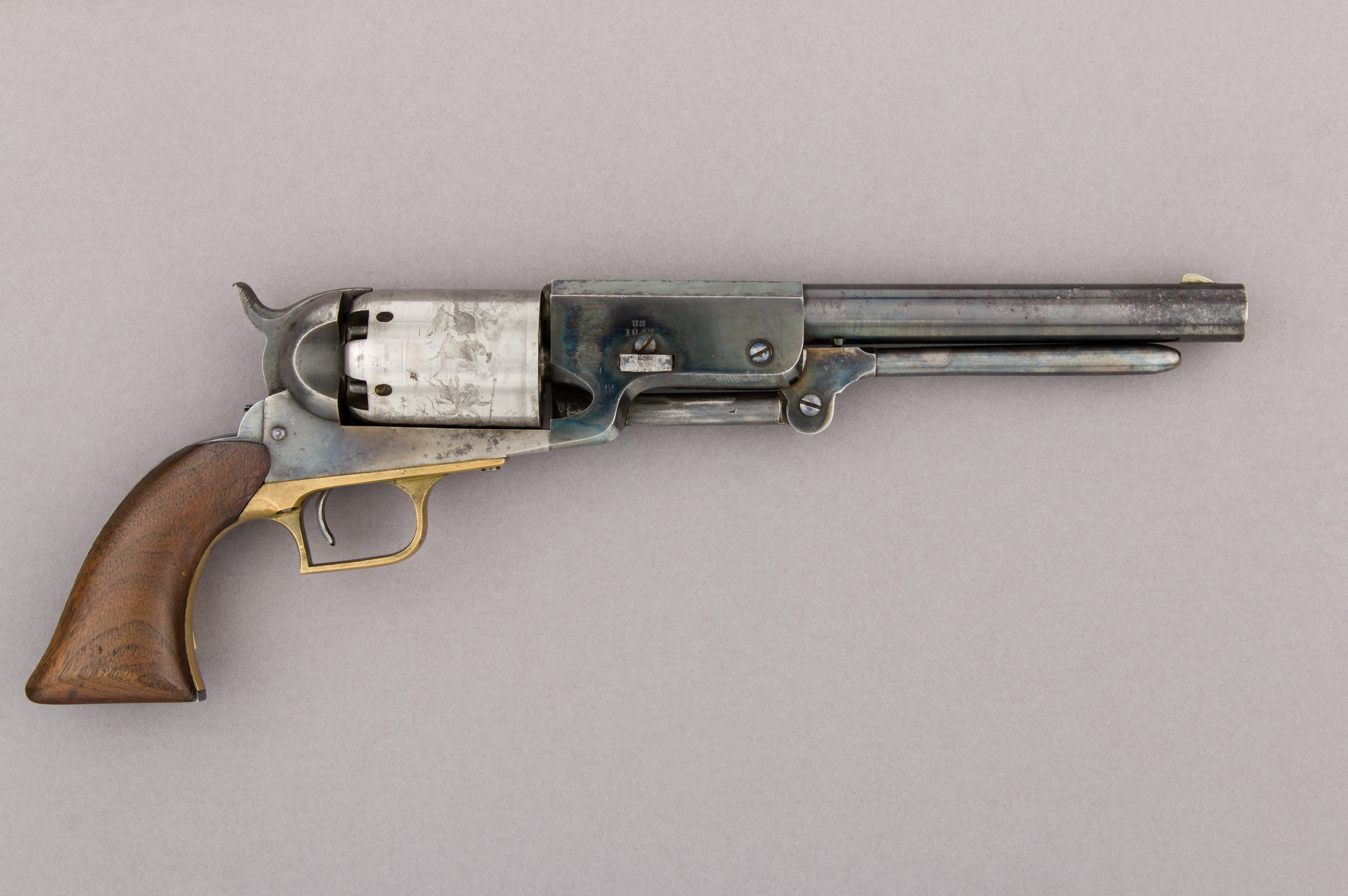
- Colt Walker Revolver number 1017. Metropolitan Museum of Art Arms and Armor collection, accession number 58.171.1
- Type: Revolver
- Place of origin: United States

Service history
- In service: 1847–1865
- Used by: State of Texas; United States; Confederate States of America
- Wars: Mexican–American War; Texas-Indian Wars; American Civil War

Production history
- Designer: Samuel Colt, Captain Samuel Walker
- Designed: 1846
- Manufacturer: Eli Whitney, Jr. at Whitneyville, Connecticut for Saml. Colt, New York City
- Produced: 1847
- No. built: 1,100
- Variants: Colt Whitneyville Hartford Dragoon Revolver, quantity about 240

Specifications
- Mass: 4.5 lb (2.0 kg)
- Length: 15.5 in (390 mm)
- Barrel length: 9 in (230 mm)
- Caliber: .44 ball, revolver.457 in (11.6 mm), dia.
- Action: Single-action
- Muzzle velocity: 1,000 to 1,350 feet per second (300–410 m/s)
- Effective firing range: 100 yards (91 m)
- Feed system: Six-round cylinder
- Sights: Blade front sight, hammer notch rear sight

The Colt Walker, sometimes known as the Walker Colt, is a single-action six-shot black powder revolver (typically firing .44 caliber lead balls). It was designed in 1846 by American firearms inventor Samuel Colt to the specifications of Captain Samuel Hamilton Walker. It was the first practical six shooter, and came to define the Old West gunfighter mystique and violence. Before Colt began mass-production in 1847, handguns had not played a significant role in the history of either the American West or the nation as a whole. It is the official handgun of the state of Texas.

== History ==
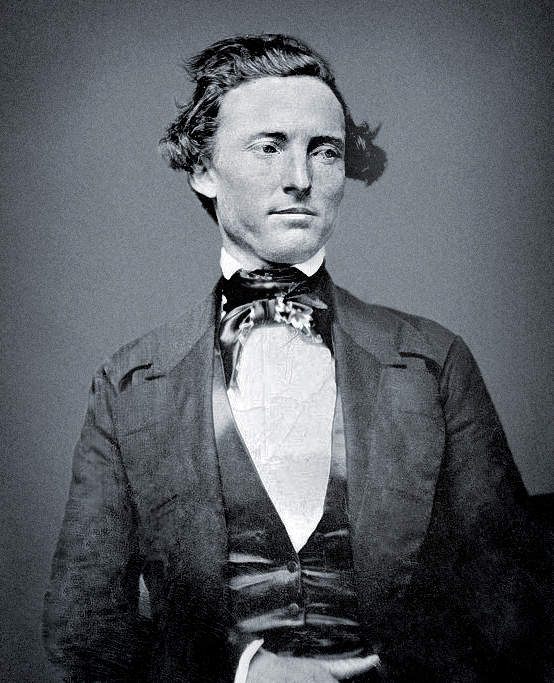
Samuel Hamilton Walker (1817–1847) who owned Walker Pistols 1009 and 1010

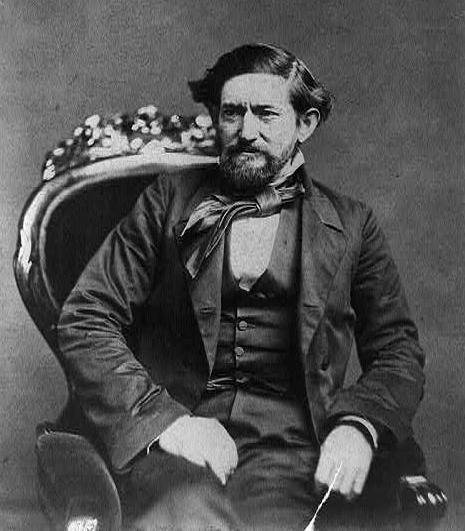
John Coffee Hays who owned Walker Pistol 1001

The Colt Walker was created in the mid-1840s in a collaboration between Texas Ranger Captain Samuel Hamilton Walker (1817–1847) and American firearms inventor Samuel Colt (1814–1862), building upon the earlier Colt Paterson design. Walker wanted a handgun that was extremely powerful at close range.

Samuel Walker carried two of his namesake revolvers in the Mexican–American War. He was killed in battle the same year his famous handgun was invented, 1847, shortly after he had received them. Only 1,100 of these guns were originally made, 1,000 as part of a military contract and an additional 100 for the civilian market, making original Colt Walker revolvers extremely rare and valuable. On October 9, 2008, one specimen that had been handed down from a Mexican War veteran was sold at auction for US$920,000. As reported in America's 1st Freedom magazine in July 2018, a Model 1847 Colt Walker pistol – the only known surviving example complete with its original case – was sold by Rock Island Auction for a record price of $1.84 million, making it the most expensive single firearm ever sold at auction.

The Republic of Texas had been the major purchaser of the early Paterson Holster Pistol (No. 5 model), a five shot cal .36 revolver, and Samuel Walker became familiar with it during his service as a Texas Ranger. In 1847, Walker was engaged in the Mexican–American War as a captain in the United States Mounted Rifles. He approached Colt, requesting a large revolver to replace the single-shot Model 1842 Percussion Pistols then in use. The desired .44–.45 caliber revolver would be carried in saddle mounted holsters. The Colt Walker was used in the Mexican–American War and on the Texas frontier.

Medical officer John "Rip" Ford took a special interest in the Walkers when they arrived at Veracruz. He obtained two examples for himself and is the primary source for information about their performance during the war and afterward. His observation that the revolver would carry as far and strike with the same or greater force than the .54 caliber Mississippi Rifle seems to have been based on a single observation of a Mexican soldier hit at a distance of well over one hundred yards. The Walker, unlike most succeeding martial pistols and revolvers, was a practical weapon out to about 100 yards (91 m).

== Specifications ==
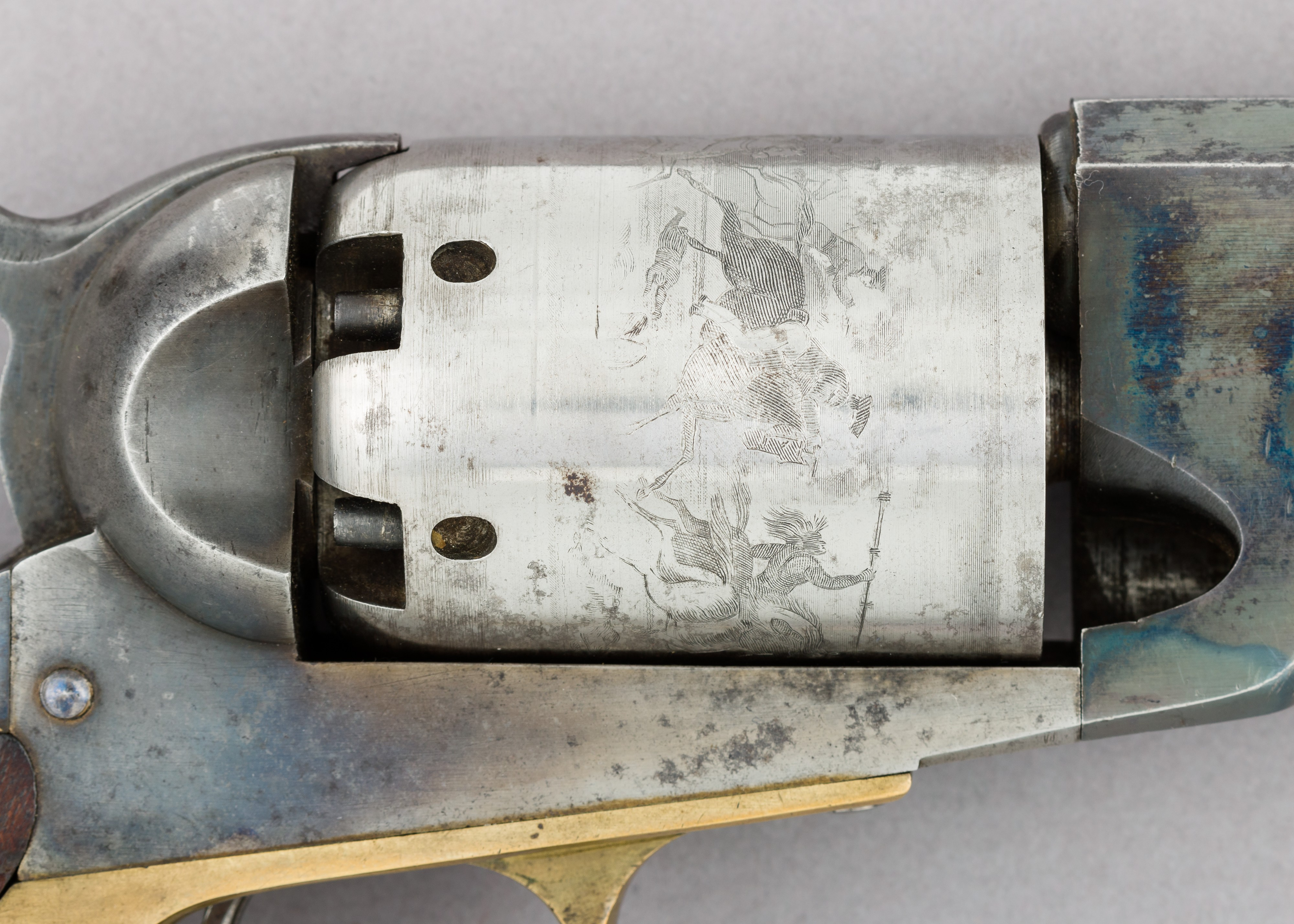
The cylinder of revolver number 1017, held by the Metropolitan Museum of Art; Waterman Ormsby's engraved battle scene can be partially seen

The Colt Walker holds a powder charge of 60 grains (3.9 g) in each chamber, more than twice what a typical black powder revolver holds. It weighs 4 1/2 pounds (2 kg) unloaded, has a 9-inch (230 mm) barrel, and fires a .44 caliber (0.454 in (11.5 mm) diameter) conical and round ball. The initial contract called for 1,000 of the revolvers and accoutrements. Colt commissioned Eli Whitney III to fill the contract and produced an extra 100 revolvers for private sales and promotional gifts. Notable recipients include John Coffee Hays.

Colt commissioned New York engraver Waterman Ormsby to etch a scene on the cylinder that was based on Walker's description of an 1844 battle.

== Problems ==
In addition to its large size and weight, problems with the Walker included ruptured cylinders when firing. This has been attributed to primitive metallurgy, soldiers allowing powder to spill across the mouths of the chambers, and even loading the original conical bullets backwards into the chambers. Under 300 of the original 1,000 were returned for repair due to a ruptured cylinder. Lard was loaded into the mouths of the cylinders on top of each bullet after loading to prevent the spark from igniting all chambers at once, a practice which continues to this day among black-powder revolver shooters, and although each chamber held 60 grains of powder, Colt recommended no more than 50 grains in each chamber.

The Walker had an inadequate loading lever catch that often allowed the loading lever to drop during recoil, preventing fast follow-up shots. Period-correct fixes for this often included placing a rawhide loop around both the barrel and loading lever, to prevent the loading lever from dropping under recoil and locking the action.

== Legacy ==
The Whitneyville-Hartford Dragoon is known as the first transitional model from the Walker to the Dragoon series, as it was largely built from leftover Walker parts. Subsequent contracts beginning in 1848 followed, for what is today known among collectors as the First, Second and Third Dragoon Models that were all based on the Colt Walker, enabling a rapid evolution of the basic revolver design. These improvements included shorter 7 1/2-inch (190 mm) barrels, shorter chambers, typically loaded only to 50 grains instead of 60 grains, thereby reducing the occurrence of ruptured cylinders, and the addition of an improved catch at the end of the loading lever to prevent the dropping of the loading lever under recoil.

The Colt Walker was quite powerful, with modern replicas firing modern FFFg black powder producing energy levels in excess of 500 foot-pounds (680 J) muzzle-energy with both picket bullets and 0.454-inch-diameter (11.5 mm), 141-grain (9.1 g) round ball bullets. The black powder Colt Walker is regarded as the most powerful commercially manufactured repeating handgun from 1847 until the introduction of the .357 Magnum in 1935, having a muzzle energy nearly exactly the same as a 4-inch-barreled (10 cm) handgun firing a .357 Magnum. Taking into account its muzzle velocity and energy produced, it currently still holds the record for the most powerful handgun ever issued by the US military. The Colt Walker has long maintained a unique position and mystique among handgun users, and its name is often used as a common expression of any overly large generic handgun example.

== Modern replicas ==
Companies such as Uberti and Pietta offer their own versions of modern replica Walkers. These are functional revolvers using percussion caps and black powder.

Important sets of functioning percussion replicas were also made under the Colt label, although not by Colt directly. This was done in two distinct phases, by somewhat different players, with varying degrees of engagement by Colt.

The first phase was from 1980 to 1982. During this period, 5019 Walker replicas were produced bearing the Colt name. They were part of the second-generation “F” series of Colt replicas marketed as “The Authentic Colt Blackpowder Series.” Barrels, cylinders, and backstops were rough-cast in Italy by Uberti. They were finished at Iver Johnson in Middlesex, New Jersey. Iver Johnson also made the frames, center pins, nipples, springs, and screws, and built the final gun. Iver Johnson gave the guns a case-hardened finish, or a Colt Blue Finish. During this phase, Colt had a close relationship with Iver Johnson, and approved of the designs and production, even though Colt did not directly produce the guns.

The second phase was from 1994 to 2002. During this period, at least 4300 Walker replicas were produced by the “Colt Blackpowder Arms Company,” and marketed as part of the Colt third-generation “Signature Series.” All the parts for the guns were made by Uberti or Armi San Marco, with Iver Johnson handling quality control, final inspection, and sales. Colt no longer had any involvement at all, and did not officially approve the revolvers, even though the Colt name was used under license.

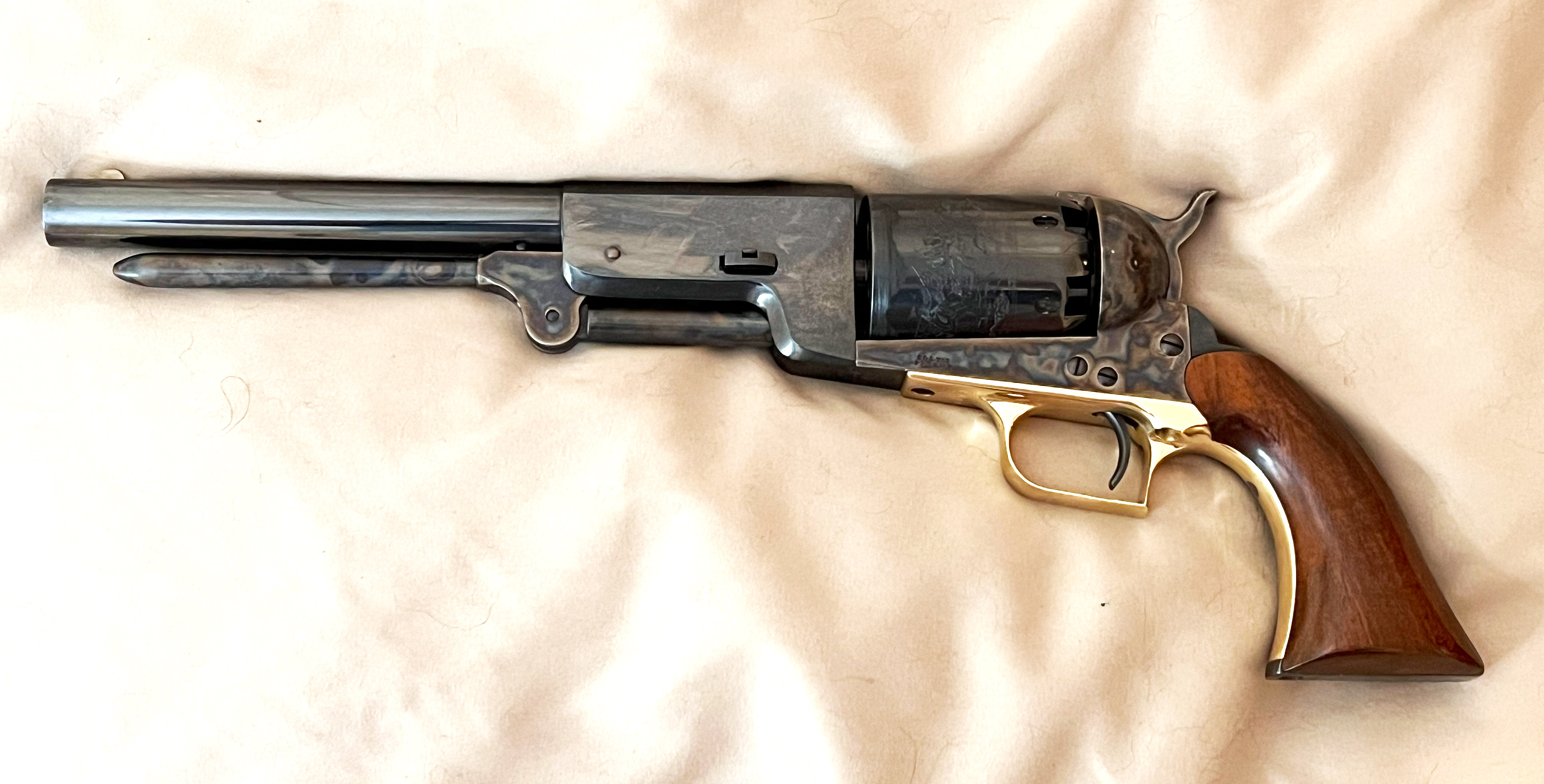
Modern functional replica of the 1847 Walker Colt, issued under the third-generation Colt Signature Series from 1994 to 2002.

Modern replicas have also been made chambered in the .45 Black Powder Magnum wildcat cartridge. These have been offered by Cimarron Firearms, Armi San Marco, and Uberti.

== In popular culture ==
On May 23, 2021, Texas Governor Greg Abbott signed a resolution naming the 1847 Colt Walker pistol the official handgun of Texas.

The .44 Walker pistol is referenced in the TV series Preacher and its source material as the weapon of choice for the Saint of Killers who dual-wields a pair. In the comics, they are described as being powerful enough to destroy a planet or kill God.

Clint Eastwood's character in the 1976 film The Outlaw Josey Wales carries a pair of Colt Walker revolvers as his main sidearms.

The pistol used by Mattie Ross's father (and later by Mattie) in the 1969 movie True Grit is a Colt Walker, though Rooster Cogburn (John Wayne) misidentifies it as a Colt Dragoon; the book True Grit adapts from only mentions a Dragoon revolver.

1847 Walkers, in keeping with the time and place setting of the Mexican-American War, make a prominent appearance in Cormac McCarthy’s novel Blood Meridian, utilized by the Glanton Gang, most notable by the kid and Judge Holden.

In a semi-biographical 2019 novel by Russ Brown titled Miss Chisum, the Colt Walker is featured in a gunfight scene. Notorious Texas Ranger, William 'Bigfoot' Wallace, is depicted as a mentor to the young cattle baron, John Chisum. After the gunfight, Wallace supplied Chisum with a pair of Walkers, and regaled him with the story of his comrade-in-arms, Samuel Walker, during the Mier expedition, in 1842.
