= Colt Pocket Percussion Revolvers =

Colt Pocket Models
- Original Pocket Police (above) and Pocket Model of 1849
- Type: Revolver
- Place of origin: United States

Production history
- Designer: Samuel Colt
- Designed: Baby Dragoon: 1847; Pocket Model of 1849: 1850; Pocket Navy and Pocket Police: 1861
- Manufacturer: Colt Firearms
- Produced: c. 1847–1873
- No. built: 325,000 .31 Pocket Models. 19,000 .36 Pocket Navy, 20,000 Pocket Police

Specifications
- Mass: 26 oz (with 4-inch barrel without loading lever)
- Length: 8.75 inches with 4-inch barrel
- Barrel length: about 3- to 6-inches
- Caliber: .31 ball/conical bullet, ( 50-71-grain .320 in., dia.) (later .36 caliber)
- Action: Single-action
- Muzzle velocity: 700–800 feet per second (average, depends on powder charge)
- Effective firing range: 25 yards (accurate defense)
- Feed system: 5-round cylinder, after serial # 187000 also 6-round cylinders
- Sights: Blade or conical pin front sight, hammer notch rear sight

The family of Colt Pocket Percussion Revolvers evolved from the earlier commercial revolvers marketed by the Patent Arms Manufacturing Company of Paterson, N.J. The smaller versions of Colt's first revolvers are also called "Baby Patersons" by collectors and were produced first in .28 to .31 caliber, and later in .36 caliber, by means of rebating the frame and adding a "step" to the cylinder to increase diameter. The .31 caliber carried over into Samuel Colt's second venture in the arms trade in the form of the "Baby Dragoon"-a small revolver developed in 1847–48. The "Baby Dragoon" was in parallel development with Colt's other revolvers and, by 1850, it had evolved into the "Colt's Revolving Pocket Pistol" that collectors now name "The Pocket Model of 1849". It is a smaller brother of the more famous "Colt's Revolving Belt Pistol of Naval Caliber" introduced the same year and commonly designated by collectors as the "1851 Navy Model". In 1855 Colt introduced another pocket percussion revolver, the Colt 1855 "Sidehammer", designed alongside engineer Elisha K. Root.

== Description and history ==
The Pocket Model revolvers all have a traditional "Colt-style" frame, generally with brass grip straps and trigger guard, and a case-hardened steel frame. In appearance, the frames are almost identical to the larger 1851 Navy and .44 caliber 1860 Army Models, with the exception of being smaller, and so having a proportionately larger trigger guard. Since they appear so similar to the larger weapons, without an object nearby to give them scale, the Pocket Revolvers tend to give an impression of being larger than they actually are; it is difficult to fit all four fingers onto the slender grip, even for a person with average-sized hands. Except for by noting the relative size of the trigger guard to the frame, it is easy for a casual observer to mistake a .31 caliber Model 1849 for an 1851 Navy (un-rebated frame, slab-sided webbing around a regular pivoting loading lever, octagonal barrel, unfluted cylinder); indeed, the Model 1851 Navy was basically a larger, .36 caliber of the Pocket Model, "belt pistol" referring to a weapon sized to fit into a belt holster, as opposed to the saddle holsters generally called for by Colt's larger cavalry combat models. Likewise, the larger .36 caliber Pocket Police Models are virtually identical to the 1860 Army Model, with rebated frame and stepped cylinder (to accommodate a size up from .31 to .36, instead of .36 to .44 as with the Army Model), a graceful, flowing webbing surrounding a new style "creeping" loading lever, and a round barrel. The most obvious difference is that the Pocket Police had a fluted 5-shot cylinder, while most Army Models were unfluted, and held six shots. The reason for this close similarity is that all four guns were closely related, and followed similar paths of development; the original .31 caliber Model 1849 was scaled up to create the .36 caliber 1851 Navy Model. Later, the Navy Model was increased in bore size by rebating the frame and enlarging the cylinder, and became the 1860 Army Model. With the success of this project, the .31 caliber of the 1849 Model was similarly increased to .36, using the same method, creating the Pocket Police and Pocket Navy models.

The Pocket Model came with and without attached loading levers and with barrel lengths from 3-6 inches; those without loading levers were loaded either with some handy dowel or equivalent tool, or by removing the cylinder from the frame and using the fixed cylinder pin (or "arbor") as a rammer). Those without loading levers are frequently called the "Wells Fargo Model" although Wells Fargo records show no .31 caliber revolvers ever purchased by that company. All variations included, it was the single largest selling of the Colt revolvers until well into the 20th century (ibid Wilson.) Civilian demand for the original .31 caliber revolver remained substantial even after introduction of the larger-bored .36 caliber Pocket Navy and Police Models, even right up until metallic cartridge revolvers entered production in the early 1870s (notably by Smith & Wesson).

In 1860, the .36 caliber Police Pocket model was created, after lessons were learned from experimentation aimed at reducing the size of the .44 Colt Holster Pistols (i.e. large cavalry weapons), Colt took advantage of stronger mass-produced steel by rebating the frame of the Navy revolver to hold a larger-diameter 44/100-inch chambered cylinder, basically fitting the power of a large cavalry saddle holster-gun and fitting it into the .36 caliber Navy Model, a gun that could be carried in a belt holster. Previously, it wasn't thought that the smaller frame could handle the power of the .44 round, but the introduction of stronger metals made it possible. Learning the lessons from this, the Colt factory applied the same technology to the .31 caliber Model 1849 Pocket revolvers, using high-strength (for the time) steel for the frame, which allowed them to remove enough material to fit a larger-diameter .36 caliber cylinder which still had five shots (the alternative was to simply retain the original cylinder diameter, and create a 4-shot .36 caliber version. The stronger steels made this sacrifice unnecessary. Other changes including lightweight fluted cylinders, and a round barrel, to offset the added weight, and a "creeping" loading lever as used in the 1861 Army Model; the result was the "Police Pocket Model of 1862". The Pocket Navy was a version similarly upsized to .36 caliber, but which retained the octagonal barrel and traditional loading lever of the earlier pocket mode. Between 1862 and 1873, Colt records document production of 19,000 of the Pocket Navies and over 20,000 Pocket Police revolvers. Relative to the .31 Pocket Revolvers, the period of manufacture was short and overall numbers were further limited by a fire at the Colt Factory in 1862 and War production concerns.

== Period use ==
One legend has it that the pocket models were popular with Civil War officers who did not rely on them as combat arms but as defense against battlefield surgeons bent on amputating a limb; a more likely reason is that officers were not expected to directly engage in combat, except in self-defense, and the small size and light weight of the Pocket models made carrying them around more attractive than larger, heavier models (especially once the .36 caliber models came out). Richard Francis Burton was a devotee of Colt Revolvers and carried a selection of them on his Middle Eastern and African journeys including the trip to Somalia and Ethiopia in 1855. A Pocket model receives prominent mention:

My revolvers excited abundant attention, though none would be persuaded to touch them. The largest, which fitted with a stock became an excellent carbine, was at once named Abu Sittah (the Father of Six) and the Shaytan or Devil: the pocket pistol became the Malunah or Accursed, and the distance to which it carried ball made every man wonder.

Other anecdotal accounts indicate that Bloody Bill Anderson, the Civil War raider, preferred the Pocket Police model. In 1872 Old west gambler Shang Stanton killed Slim Jim Shumway with an 1849 Pocket Revolver with a silver finish and a carved ivory grip.

== Shooting characteristics ==
The Pocket Revolvers, both original and replica, are somewhat more challenging to shoot at moderate range than the larger Colt-type revolvers. The small size makes for a small and slender grip, and even average-sized hands will have trouble fitting the pinkie finger. The thinness and round cross-section of the grip make it easy for the gun to shift in the shooter's grasp, and the sights are very small and difficult to see, compared to modern weapons. Point of impact is generally a foot or more above point of aim at 25 yards, but is consistent. Nevertheless, by holding Kentucky windage or installing a taller front sight, the shooter may expect to make telling hits on a man-sized silhouette target at that range and very effective sustained fire at shorter distances. In the gun's intended purpose (short-range shooting at man-sized targets) this creates little problem. A shooter need only point the weapon at the center of the torso (the easiest point of aim), and fire, and the ball will hit somewhere in the chest region, which is far more ideal for both parties than an abdominal wound. All in all, for a weapon designed mostly as a relatively close-range defensive weapon, it was quite suitable for its era.

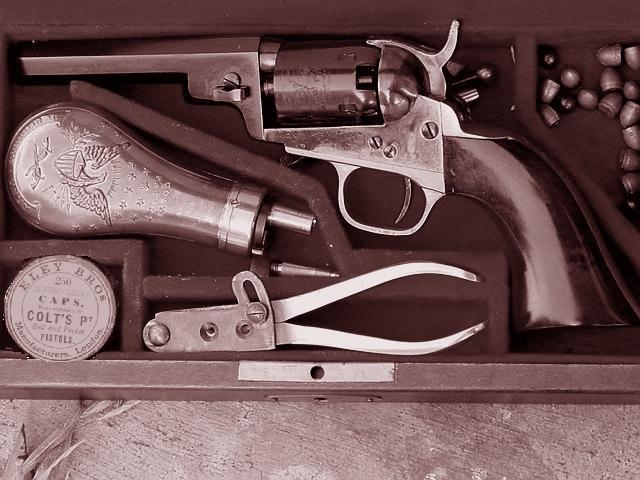
A leverless 1849 Pocket model with cased accessories including powder flask, bullet mould, bullets, balls and percussion caps. This variation closely resembles the earlier "Baby Dragoon"

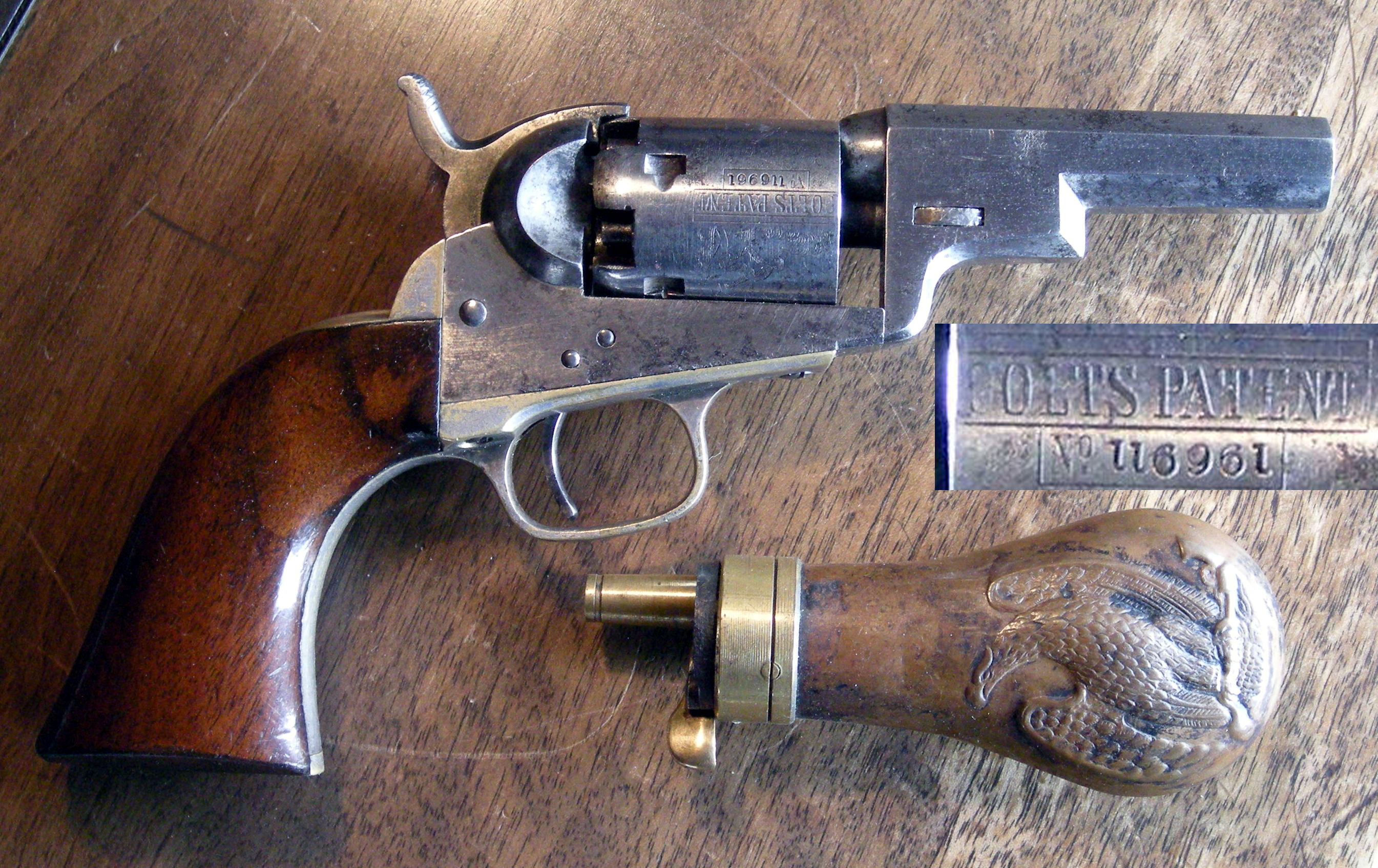
Colt 1849 Pocket “Wells Fargo”, 3 inch barrel, without loading lever

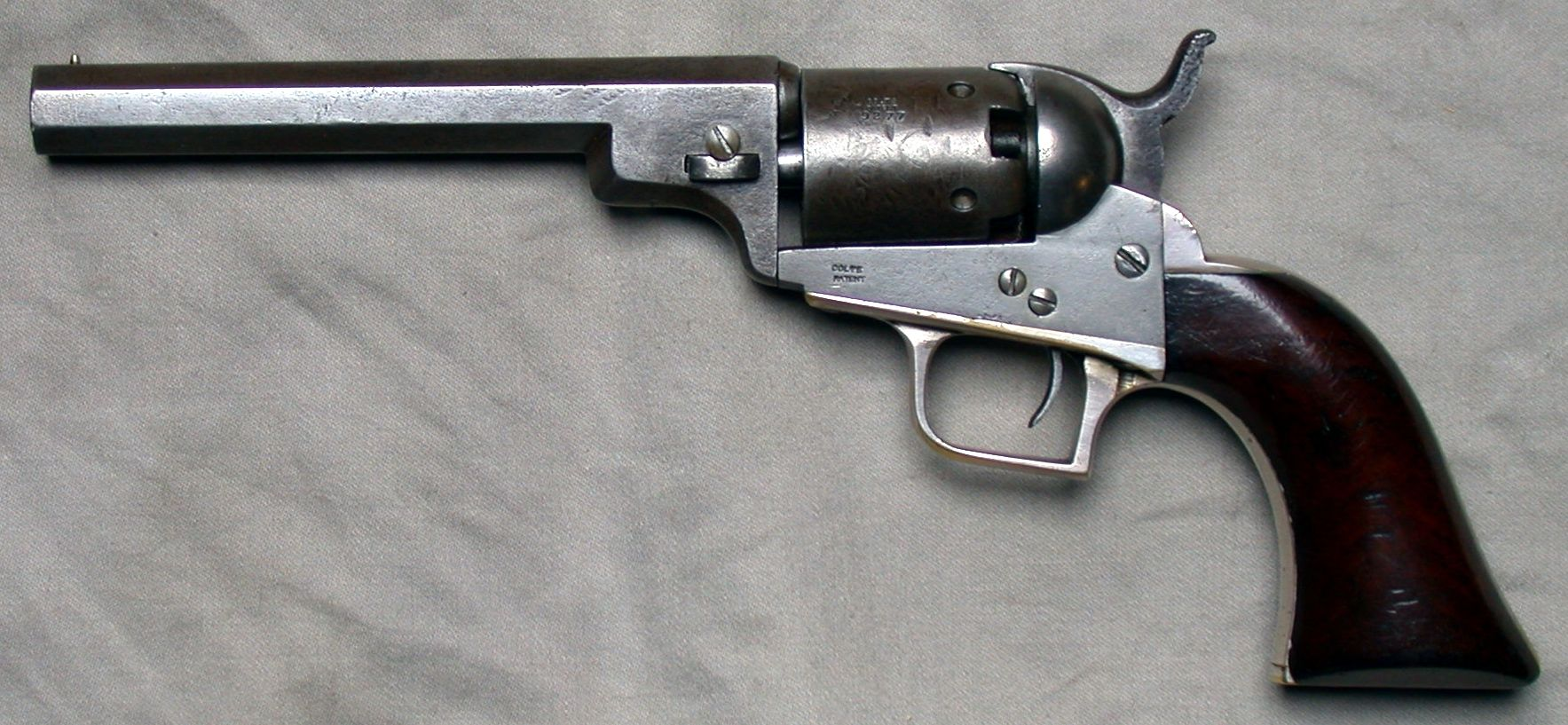
Colt Pocket Pistol Mod 1848 .31 caliber, "Baby Dragoon" Square-back Trigger Guard, round cylinder stop slots.

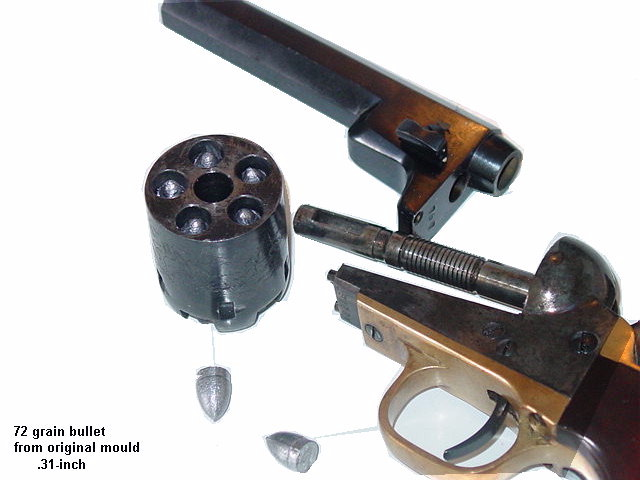
The cylinder arbor serves as a bullet seater on Pocket models without loading levers

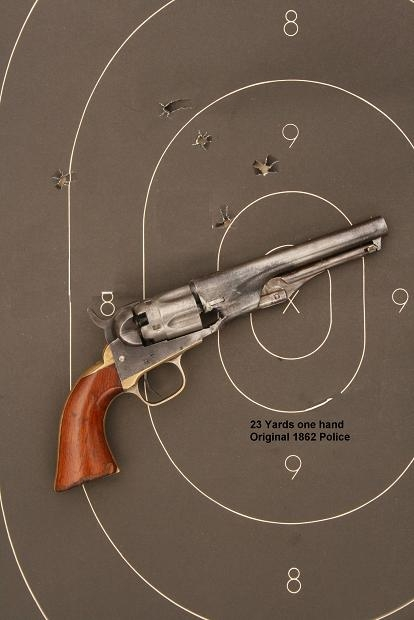
Original Pocket Police fired from 23 yards

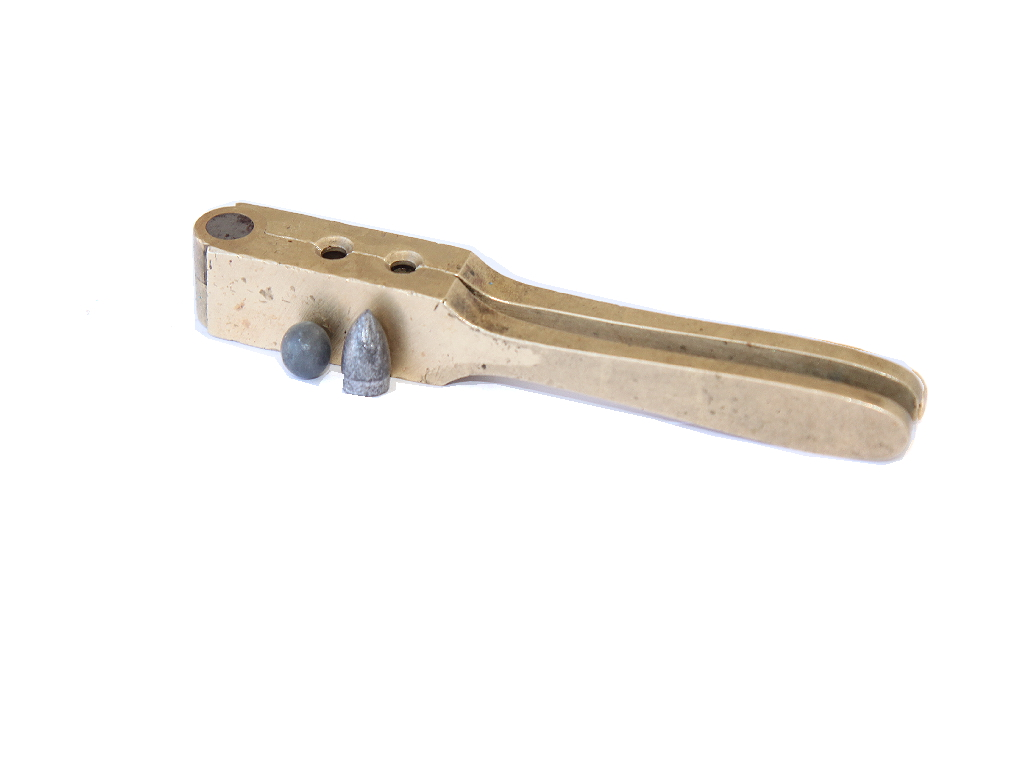
An Original Colt patent ball and bullet mould for the Colt Revolving Pocket Pistol (1849)

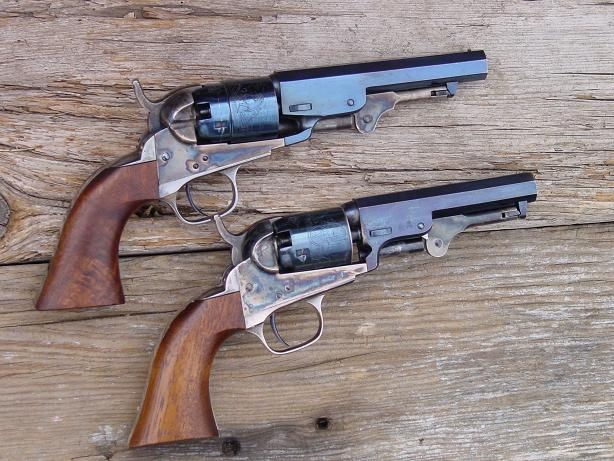
Replica Pocket Navy top with replica 31 Pocket Model below
