= Samuel Stone (disambiguation) =

Samuel Stone (1602–1663) was a Puritan minister.

Samuel Stone may also refer to:

- Samuel J. Stone (1887–1981), micro philanthropist
- Samuel John Stone (1839–1900), Anglican minister and hymnwriter
- Samuel Hanson Stone (1849–1909), American politician
- Samuel M. Stone, president of Colt's Manufacturing

== See also ==
- Sam Stone (disambiguation)
