= Mark 23 Mod 0 =

Mark 23 Mod 0 (Mk.23 mod 0) may refer to:

- Heckler & Koch Mark 23, a semi-automatic .45ACP pistol
- Stoner 63, a 5.56×45mm NATO round light machine gun

== See also ==
- Mark 23 (disambiguation)
