= Mark 23 =

Mark 23 or Mk.XXIII or variation, may refer to:

== U.S. Navy ==
The U.S. Navy designation Mark 23 may refer to:

- Heckler & Koch Mark 23, a .45 ACP-caliber handgun
- Mark 23 machine gun, a configuration of the Stoner 63 weapons system used by US Navy SEALs.
- Mark 23 Pistol and Suppressor Kit, a Vietnam War-era kit issued to US Navy SEALs, containing a Mark 22 pistol and a Mark 3 noise suppressor.
- Mark 23 torpedo, a submarine-launched anti-ship torpedo used in World War II

== UK Royal Navy ==
- Mark 23 Grog, a British wire-guided 21-inch torpedo
- BL 6-inch Mk XXIII naval gun, a British WWII naval artillery gun
- QF 4-inch naval gun Mk XXIII, a British Cold-War submarine deck gun

== Other uses ==
- Bolo Mk XXIII, a fictional super-tank

== See also ==
- Mark 23 Mod 0
