= Colt 2000 =

Type of semi-automatic pistol

All American 2000
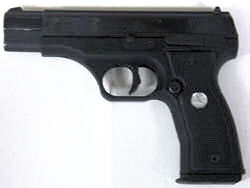
- Polymer framed version of the Colt All American 2000 pistol
- Type: Semi-automatic pistol
- Place of origin: United States

Production history
- Designer: Reed Knight, Eugene Stoner
- Designed: 1992
- Manufacturer: Colt
- Produced: 1992–1994
- No. built: ~20,000
- Variants: Polymer Frame, Aluminum Frame

Specifications
- Mass: Polymer version 29 oz. Aluminum version 32 oz.
- Length: 190 mm (7.5 in)
- Cartridge: 9×19mm Parabellum
- Feed system: 15-round Detachable box magazine
- Sights: Fixed, 3-dot

The Colt 2000 or All American 2000 is a polymer or aluminum-alloy framed, locked-breech, rotating barrel, semiautomatic, 9 mm handgun with a magazine capacity of 15 rounds manufactured by Colt.

Designed by C. Reed Knight and Eugene Stoner, it was hoped by Colt that this pistol would recapture their stake in the police market as departments across the United States switched from double-action revolvers to semiautomatic pistols. However, the pistol was plagued with reports of inaccuracy and unreliability, and is regarded as an embarrassing failure.

== History ==
The Colt All American 2000 was introduced at the 1990 Shooting Hunting and Outdoor Trade Show (SHOT Show). It had been a joint venture between Reed Knight and Eugene Stoner of Knight's Armament over a period of several years. Once the design was handed off to Colt, the two designers had little input regarding the final design.

C. Reed Knight specified that the pistol should have a 6-pound trigger pull. Colt increased this to 12 pounds and extended the barrel and length of the grip frame. The Colt 2000 was made from parts produced by an outside vendor and assembled in the company's West Hartford facility.

Despite the innovations and bearing the Colt name, the pistol was plagued with reports of inaccuracy and unreliability, and suffered from the poor publicity of having to be recalled in 1993 due to a safety recall. The massive product launch failed and production of the All American 2000 ended in 1994. Colt's President Ron Whitaker stated that sales volume was not sufficient for production to remain economical.

Colt historian, Rick Sapp, has called the pistol "one of the most embarrassing failures in the company's history." Massad Ayoob was particularly critical of the design calling it "sad and ugly with pathetic accuracy".

Despite the negative reception of gun related media, the pistol has been found to largely not have the negative elements described in its early reviews. A comprehensive video done by the YouTube channel FuddBlasters has not been able to replicate the issues described by the early reviews of journalists, casting into doubt the validity of the alleged issues described. Recent documentation and repair reports have also suggested that the 1993 recall was not due to the design being inherently unsafe, but was a revision of the trigger to a more modern, even safer unit.

== Design ==
The Colt 2000's internal workings were based on older firearms designs from the early twentieth century. The rotating barrel, for example, was based on that of the Steyr 1912 and the trigger and sear mechanisms were based on the Le Français produced by the French Manufacture d'Armes et des Cycles de Saint-Etienne, AKA Manufrance, since 1914. These features allow the barrel and slide to work as a unit moving to the rear until the barrel lug rotates into the cam-block and stops. The barrel lugs then align to allow the slide to continue its travel to the rear and extraction and ejection of the spent round occurs. The pistol breaks down into seven major parts for disassembly. Unlike most other polymer-framed handguns, the All-American 2000 had removable grip panels.

An aluminum framed version of the pistol with wooden grips was made in addition to the polymer framed version and both are sought after by collectors of Colt Firearms because of the low numbers produced during their short production run.

== See also ==
- Wonder Nine
