= Samuel M. Stone =

Manufacturing executive

- Born: Samuel M. Stone; February 19, 1869; Urbana, Ohio
- Died: December 9, 1959 (aged 90); Hartford, Connecticut
- Occupation: Company President
- Employer: Colt's Manufacturing Company
- Spouse: Alice Osborne Bailey Stone

Samuel M. Stone (February 19, 1869 – December 9, 1959) was a President of Colt's Manufacturing Company who saw the company through the build-up to World War I and the end of World War II.

== Early life ==
Stone was born in Urbana, Ohio in 1869 where he attended public schools. In 1890 he left Ohio for St. Louis to work as a buyer for Simmons Hardware Company. He worked at Simmons for 15 years, eventually leaving to accept a position at Colt Firearms.

== Colt's ==
Samuel M. Stone started with Colt's Manufacturing Company in 1905 as a salesman. He was elected to company vice-president in 1916, and eventually President of Colt's from 1921 to 1944.

Anticipating a military draw-down following World War I, Stone and company president William C. Skinner implemented a diversification program at Colt's Manufacturing similar to that done at the close of the American Civil War. Skinner and Stone acquired contracts for business machines, calculators, dishwashers, motorcycles, and automobiles; all marketed under a name other than Colt. Other measures included cutting the work week, reducing salaries, and keeping more employees on the payroll than they needed, all of which kept the company in business.

Striking workers from the plant firebombed Stone's house in an act of terrorism in 1934. Later that year, Stone was summoned to testify before the Nye Committee to address allegations that Colt (among many other companies also under investigation) had improperly campaigned for America to enter World War I, in order to increase arms sales to the U.S. government. Company records orived that this was incorrect, disclosing that Stone (and Colt as a whole) had been concentrating on selling pistols to markets in Latin America and Asia instead.

In 1944 Colt faced labor and cash flow problems once again, as the demands of wartime production had required their workforce to surge dramatically, from 1100 workers in 1936, to a peak of over 13,000. The Federal Government intervened to ensure war materiel production was not interrupted, and had Stone step down as president.
