= Sam Stone =

Sam Stone may refer to:

- "Sam Stone" (song), 1971 song by John Prine
- Sam Stone (character), character in the video game series Serious Sam
- Sam Stone (rugby league), Australian rugby league player
- Sam Stone, pen name of the British writer Samantha Lee Howe

== See also ==
- Samuel Stone (disambiguation)
