= Colt OHWS =

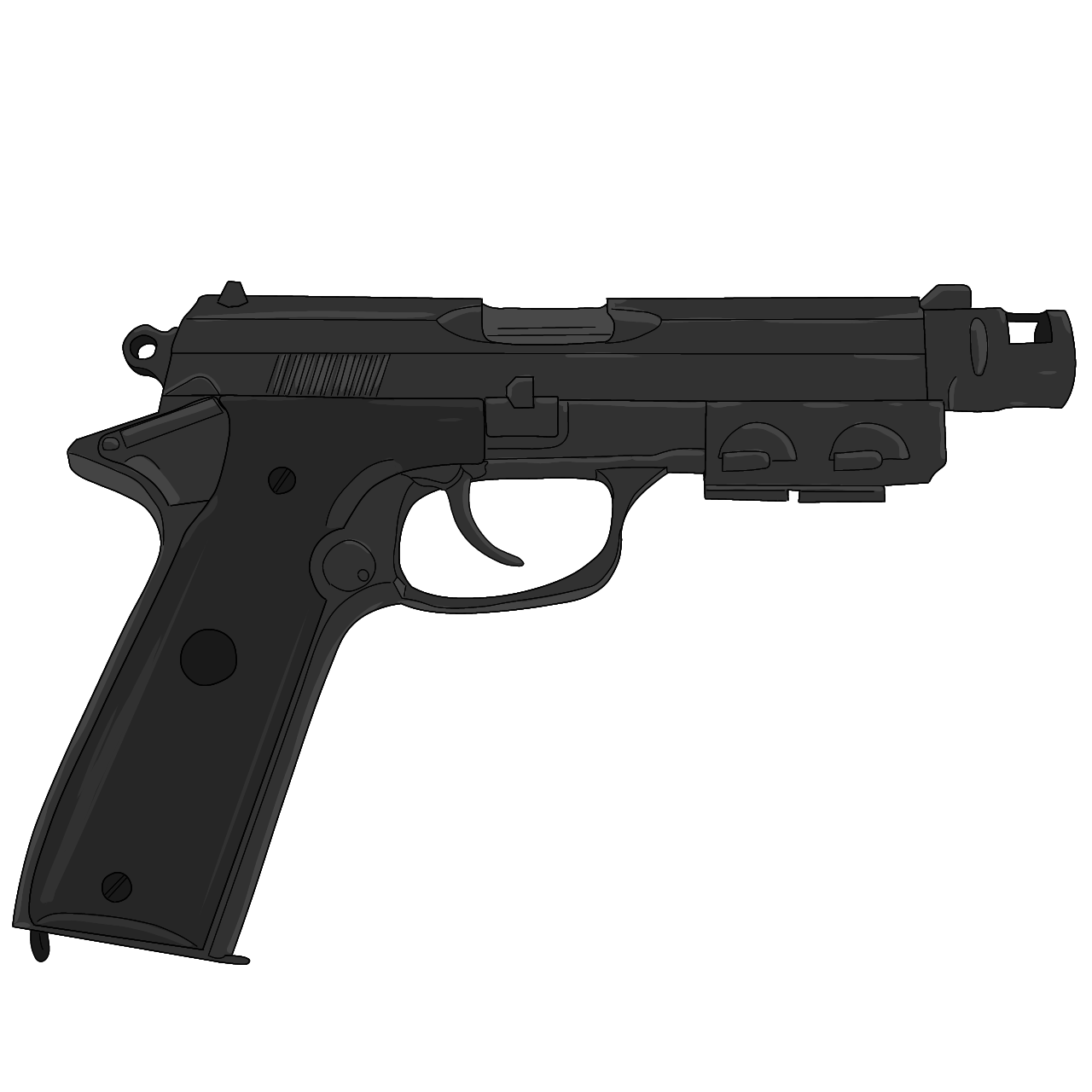
- Illustration of the OHWS.
- Type: Semi-automatic pistol
- Place of origin: United States

Production history
- Manufacturer: Colt

Specifications
- Length: 249 mm
- Barrel length: 121 mm
- Cartridge: .45 ACP
- Caliber: 11.43 (.45 in)
- Maximum firing range: 50 m
- Feed system: 10-round detachable box magazine
- Sights: Fixed iron

The Colt OHWS (Offensive Handgun Weapon System; also known as Colt SOCOM) was a semi-automatic pistol created by Colt to compete for the United States Special Operations Command (US SOCOM) Offensive Handgun Weapon System (OHWS) tender. The winner of this competition would become the standard-issue handgun for most US special forces groups. The OHWS contract was awarded to Heckler & Koch (H&K) for their MK23 Mod 0 pistol, and Colt scrapped the project.

The OWHS program was started to find a pistol that can fire a specialized .45 ACP round known as the .45 ACP +P.

== History ==
SOCOM launched the OHWS program in the 1980s; its objective to either find or produce a pistol that can be used as a primary weapon in certain field missions.

Colt developed their OHWS handgun during the early 1990s to compete for a contract under the US SOCOM Offensive Handgun Weapon System (OHWS) program and replace the M9 pistols. In August 1991, Colt and H&K were awarded contracts to develop the SOCOM pistols. Prorotypes were submitted in August 1992 to Crane Division, Naval Surface Warfare Center. Testing took place until Spring 1993.

The program was divided to three phases. Colt and H&K were tasked to develop 30 prototypes with pistols, sound suppressors and laser aiming modules.

SOCOM found the Colt OHWS to be too bulky, not as durable as expected and the accessories to be too meticulous to use and fit, leading to a loss in the competition for SOCOM's contract to the Heckler & Koch Mark 23. The pistol was dropped after the first phase. H&K subsequently went on as the only manufacturer to go on with the second and third phases.

The contract was awarded to H&K in June 1995 with the first pistols delivered by May 1, 1996.

== Design ==
The system consisted of the pistol, removable sound suppressor and a laser aiming module (LAM). The OHWS, while chambered in .45 ACP, was not designed to handle SOCOM's intended primary round, .45 ACP +P.

The OHWS was based on the M1911 frame and carried a single-stack 10-round magazine. The magazine release was located at the base of the trigger guard. While the pistol was chambered in .45 ACP, there was an attempt to use 10mm ammo. This proposal did not work out due to excessive recoil and concerns about shelf life for any pistol that used it. It is suggested that OHWS' grips are better than the MK23.

It was based from other Colt firearms including the M1911A1, Double Eagle and All American 2000. Colt used the rotating barrel locking system from the All American 2000—one of the strongest locking systems designed for handguns; a double-action trigger with de-cocker, and hammer from the Double Eagle; and the manual safety and firing mechanism from the M1911A1,

The design was modified from the M1911A1, except mostly machined, and the slide was made of stainless steel. Colt added a slide lock, to stop cycling of the mechanism and slide in sound-sensitive cases.

=== Silencer ===
The silencer was designed by Knight's Armament Company (KAC) under Doug Olson. It was attached on the pistol through a muzzle brake.

=== Laser Aiming Module ===
The LAM uses four operating modes: visible laser, visible laser illumination, infrared laser and infrared illumination.

=== Ammo ===
Feedback from SOCOM resulted in the use of +P ammo being designed to fit their requirements. However, this would mean that the base pistol would need to be redesigned so that it can use +P ammo without having malfunctions.

== Bibliography ==
- Hogg, Ian V. (1994). Jane's Infantry Weapons, 1994-95. Jane's Information Group. ISBN 978-0710611598.
- Kinard, Jeff (2003). Pistols: An Illustrated History of Their Impact. ABC-CLIO. ISBN 978-1851094707.
- McNab, Chris (2019). Weapons of the US Special Operations Command. Osprey Publishing. ISBN 978-1472833105.
