= Samuel J. Stone =

Samuel J. Stone (1887-1981) under the pseudonym B. Virdot gave out cash gifts to 150 people in Canton, Ohio in 1933 in an anonymous social experiment. His work is the basis of the book A Secret Gift, published by Penguin Press.
