= William C. Skinner =

- Born: William Converse Skinner; January 26, 1855; Malone, New York, US
- Died: March 8, 1922 (aged 67); Hartford, Connecticut, US
- Burial place: Cedar Hill Cemetery
- Occupation: Company president
- Employer: Colt's Manufacturing Company
- Spouse: Florence C. Roberts (m. 1880)

William Converse Skinner (January 26, 1855 – March 8, 1922) was an American manufacturing executive.

== Biography ==
William C. Skinner was born in Malone, New York. He attended Albany Law School in Albany, New York. He clerked for the New York Legislature and railroad in Albany before moving to Hartford, Connecticut, to attend Trinity College in 1872. He married Florence Clarissa Roberts on October 25, 1880.

In 1892 he was appointed to the staff of Morgan Bulkeley with the rank of Colonel. In 1906 he was selected to serve as vice president of Colt's Manufacturing Company. He was elected president three years later and served in this capacity until 1911. After a five-year hiatus, he resumed this position in 1916. Skinner served as president of Colt a second time until 1921, when he resigned to become chairman of the company's board of directors.

In anticipation of the military draw down following World War I, Skinner implemented a diversification program at Colt's Manufacturing similar to that done at the close of the American Civil War. Skinner acquired contracts for business machines, calculators, dishwashers, motorcycles, and automobiles; all marketed under a name other than Colt. Other measures included cutting the work week, reducing salaries, and keeping more employees on the payroll than they needed, all of which kept the company in business after Skinner's retirement.

Skinner died at his home in Hartford on March 8, 1922, and was buried at Cedar Hill Cemetery.
