= Heckler & Koch Mark 23 =

Heckler & Koch MK 23
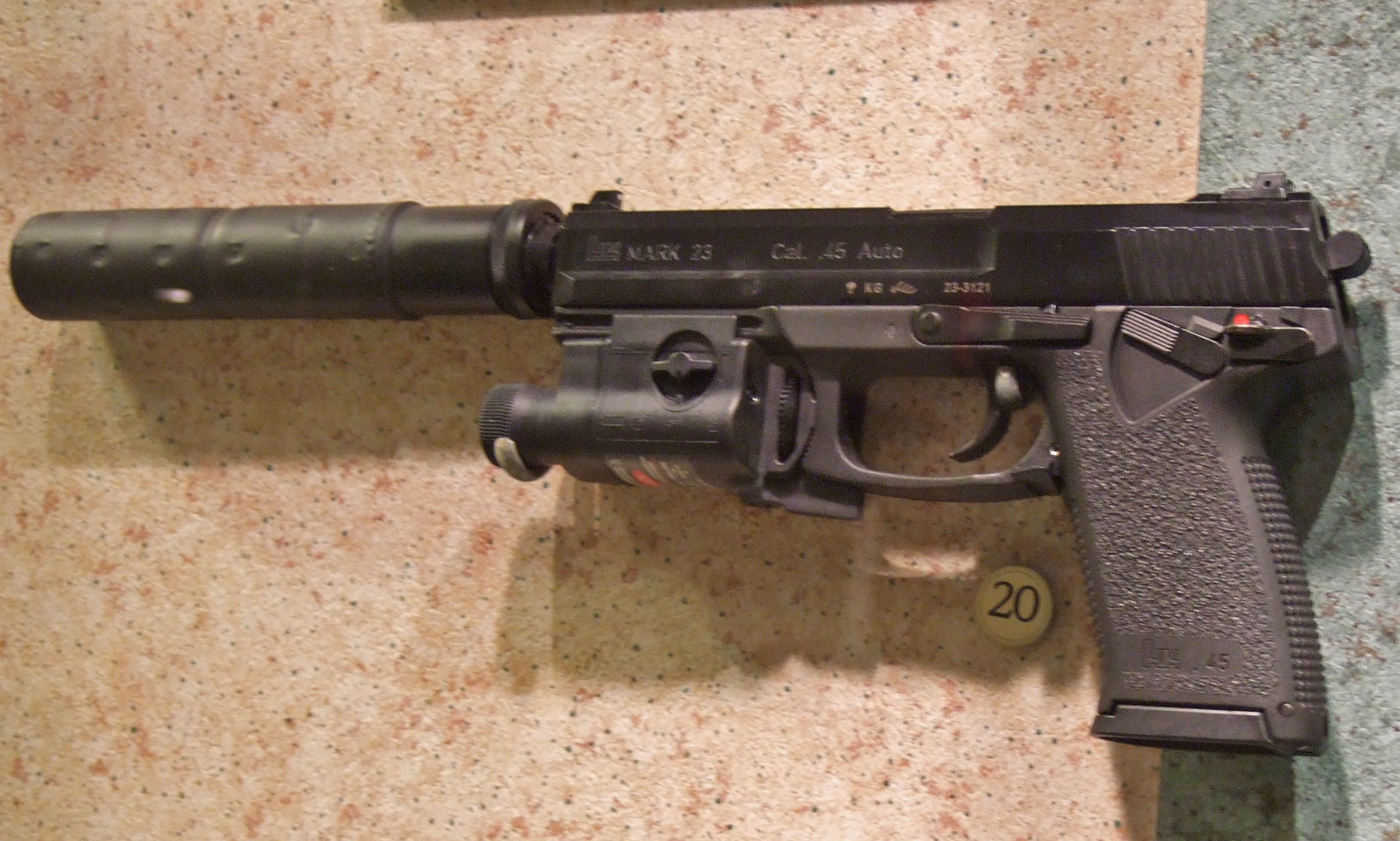
- MARK 23 equipped with suppressor and laser aiming module.
- Type: Semi-automatic pistol
- Place of origin: Germany

Service history
- In service: 1996–present
- Used by: See Users

Production history
- Designed: 1990s
- Manufacturer: Heckler & Koch
- Produced: 1991 – July 2010 (Military version only) 1991-present (Civilian version)
- Variants: Mk 23 MOD 0 (military markets); Mark 23/MARK 23 (civilian and law enforcement markets)

Specifications
- Mass: 1.2 kg (2.43 lb), empty; 1.47 kg (3.2 lb), loaded; 2.29 kg (5.0 lb), loaded, with suppressor and LAM
- Length: 245.11 mm (9.65 in), without suppressor; 421 mm (16.5 in), with suppressor
- Barrel length: 149.10 mm (5.87 in)
- Width: 39.116 mm (1.54 in)
- Height: 150 mm (5.9 in)
- Cartridge: .45 ACP Can also fire .45 Super using factory parts and no modifications
- Action: Short recoil, DA/SA, Modified Browning Action, Linkless. SA pull 4.85 lbs. (2.20 kg) and DA pull 12.13 lbs. (5.50 kg)
- Rate of fire: Semi-automatic
- Muzzle velocity: 370 m/s (1200 ft/s)
- Effective firing range: 50 m
- Feed system: Detachable box magazine; capacities: 10 rounds (restricted); 12 rounds (standard); 17 rounds (extended); 20 rounds (extended); 24 rounds (extended)

The Heckler & Koch MK 23, Mk 23 MOD 0, Mark 23, or USSOCOM MARK 23 is a semi-automatic large-frame pistol chambered in .45 ACP, designed specifically to be an offensive pistol. The USSOCOM version of the MK23 came paired with a laser aiming module (LAM) and suppressor. The USSOCOM MK23 was adopted by the United States Special Operations Command (USSOCOM) for special operations units, beating out the nearest competitor, Colt's OHWS. Development of the pistol began in 1991 as special operations representatives identified the need for an "Offensive Handgun Weapons System—Special Operations Peculiar", and delivery of the pistols began in May 1996 to the special operations units.

While the USSOCOM Mk 23 designation usually refers to the complete system, it is also commonly used to refer to the pistol component alone. The LAM and suppressor were developed by Insight Technology and Knight's Armament Company (KAC), respectively. The civilian version of the Mk 23 sold by itself is designated the Mark 23.

== Overview ==
The Mk 23 is considered a match grade pistol, and is capable of making a 2-inch (51 mm) group at 25 metres (27 yd). The Mk 23 is designed for exceptional durability in harsh environments, being waterproof and corrosion-resistant. The barrel is manufactured with polygonal rifling, which is reported to improve accuracy and durability, and is much more expensive to produce. It also features an ambidextrous safety and magazine release on both sides of the frame. The magazine release is at the rear edge of the trigger guard, which is wide enough to allow the use of gloves. A decocking lever is on the left side, which will silently lower the cocked hammer. The Mk 23 is part of a larger weapon system that includes an attachable Laser Aiming Module (LAM), a suppressor, and some other features such as a special high-pressure match cartridge (.45 +P ammunition).

The firearm was tested and found to be capable of firing tens of thousands of rounds without a barrel change. It remains reliable in harsh conditions, making it suitable for use by special forces. The .45 ACP round is subsonic in the standard loading, making it suitable for use with a suppressor.

== Development ==
In 1989, US SOCOM began reviewing its equipment to determine which gear met the needs of its special close quarters battle role. Studying small arms revealed 120 types and configurations of infantry weapons across different units. The logistics of getting spare parts for all these weapons were overwhelming. In response, SOCOM decided to standardize small arms among all units. One area for improvement was the pistol, addressed through the Offensive Handgun Weapon System (OHWS) competition. It would replace pistols like the M9 in 9mm, which were used by regular troops as secondary weapons. SOCOM's use of small units that operate in close means that pistols are more likely to be used as primary weapons.

The caliber for the OHWS was quickly decided not to be the NATO-standard 124 gr (8.0 g) 9 mm due to a lack of stopping power. The FBI had selected the 10 mm auto to replace their 9 mm pistols, but it was too powerful, few manufacturers produced it, and the round caused short weapon service life. The .45 ACP caliber was chosen and improved upon with the high-velocity, high-pressure 185 gr (12.0 g) +P loading.

The OHWS pistol had to fire multiple rounds in addition to the +P cartridge and maintain a long service life with high-pressure ammo. The M1911 had been proven in service for over 70 years, but was rejected. High-pressure rounds would destroy it, and it did not fire reliably with a suppressor. Upgrading the M1911 would cost more than it was worth, so it was decided to select an entirely new design. The quote request was for a system that included a pistol, suppressor, and laser aiming module. The pistol had to be corrosion-resistant, have a high mean rounds between failures (MRBF), and serve as a primary weapon.

After several tests, Heckler & Koch and Colt submissions were selected to move to phase I of the OHWS program in August 1991. They were awarded developmental contracts to produce 30 systems. At the time the program began, HK was studying which aspects were most desirable in handguns for the U.S. civilian market. They came up with a design that had these features, including reliability, durability, affordability, and others, by February 1991. Colt, however, essentially drew upon existing technologies for their submission called the Colt OHWS. They used an M1911 frame that could accept a 10-round magazine, the decocking mechanism from the Colt Double Eagle, and the rotating barrel locking system from the All American 2000. The barrel of the Colt OHWS could not directly attach a suppressor, so a mounting was added to a rail in front of the handguard.

Colt was eliminated after phase I, leaving only HK to move on to phase II. This phase subjected the pistols to the strictest reliability testing any pistol ever undergone. The requirement was for at least 2,000 MRBF; the HK Mk 23 averaged 6,027 MRBF and could reach 15,122 MRBF. Three pistols underwent a 30,000-round endurance test and maintained an accuracy of 2.5 in (64 mm) at 25 meters; only the O-ring needed replacement after 20,000 rounds. The weapons worked in temperatures from -25 degrees Fahrenheit to 140 degrees Fahrenheit while exposed to mud, ice, and sand. Phase III was the awarding of a production contract to HK in June 1995. Their pistol was type classified as the Mark 23 Mod 0, and 1,950 systems were ordered at $1,186 each. All pistols were produced in Germany, and the first was delivered to SOCOM on 1 May 1996.

Even though the Mark 23 had performed admirably, several factors worked against its use. Previous operators were trained to fire multiple 9 mm rounds, and they thought firing extra rounds made up for not using harder-hitting but larger and heavier .45 ACP rounds. The introduction of the smaller and lighter HK USP, political pressures, and shortages of +P ammunition also contributed to the pistol's downfall. As the war on terror went on, operators saw the effectiveness of the .45 ACP in combat and renewed use of the Mark 23, as well as other pistols chambered for the round. The large size of the Mark 23 earned it the nickname "the world's only crew-served pistol" amongst the troops who used it.

== Adoption ==
The Mk 23 MOD 0 was built as an "offensive" handgun for U.S. special operations forces under USSOCOM, per request made in 1989. Military versions of the firearm have the writing "MK23 USSOCOM" engraved on the slide. The first Mk 23 production models were delivered to SOCOM on 1 May, 1996.

HK commercially markets the Mk 23 and its derivatives, but not the complete SOCOM system. The suppressor is made by Knight's Armament Company and was selected over the one HK originally included in its entry. Insight Technology won the contract to produce the laser aiming module, later designated AN/PEQ-6. One version of the LAM produces a visible light dot, while another produces an infrared dot that can only be seen through night vision goggles. There have since been different LAM models and, at least commercially, different suppressors as well. Some users have reported that the cumulative effects of recoil can occasionally cause the can of the suppressor to come loose, but that it is relatively easy to improvise solutions.

=== Civilian Mark 23 ===
Heckler & Koch has offered the Mk 23 on the civilian market and law enforcement as the MARK 23. It is distributed by its subsidiaries HK Inc. (United States) and HKJS GmbH (Germany).

The models for the U.S. market initially came with a 10-round magazine, to comply with the U.S. Assault Weapons Ban. In 2004, the ban expired. The civilian Mark 23 comes with the same 12-round magazine as the government variants, except in a few states that enforce their own bans on magazines larger than 10 rounds. In Canada, the Mark 23 pistol is still supplied only with 10-round magazines, as per the 1995 Firearms Act.

According to the Operators Manual, there are a few differences between the civilian Mark 23 and the government Mk 23. These differences are the slide engraving "Mark 23" which is only for the first half of the first year of production in 1996 (KG date code), the roll-mark "MARK 23" which is for mid 1996 to now, these instead of "MK23 USSOCOM", Matte vs shiny finish for different civilian years, tan vs black frame (500 tan ones were made), and a barrel conforming to SAAMI headspace specifications for the military vs civilian made, as the military barrels were made to allow ball ammunition to work more reliably.

== Alternatives ==
Despite its positive points, the Mk 23's large size and weight have attracted some criticism. The handgun was designed for offense rather than defense, the size and weight intentionally incorporated to help absorb recoil forces and retain greater accuracy; but this also decreased its ease of use, comfort, and draw speed in defensive situations which require a more conventional, compact pistol.

In response, HK developed the USP Tactical pistol based on the original USP. The USP Tactical and Mk 23 look similar. However, they are different pistols by design and purpose, the Tactical retains much of the performance of the Mk 23 without the bulky size. It uses a different suppressor (due to 16 x 1mm left handed threading, as opposed to 16 x 1mm right-handed on the Mk 23). An even more compact pistol than the USP Tactical for counter-terrorist and special forces use is the HK USP Compact Tactical, which has its own optional LAM. The USP-CT is lighter and can accommodate a suppressor, making it a prime choice for Special Forces on covert operations. Recently, HK has developed the HK 45, a much more contoured pistol based on the P2000, P8, and P30 models.

== Users ==
- Indonesia: Komando Pasukan Katak (Kopaska) tactical diver group and Komando Pasukan Khusus (Kopassus) special forces group.
- Malaysia: Mk 23 MOD 0 adopted by Pasukan Gerakan Khas Counter-terrorism Police Squad of the Royal Malaysia Police and Pasukan Khas Laut Maritime Counter-terrorism group of the Royal Malaysian Navy.
- Poland: Used by GROM.
- United States: Adopted by the U.S. SOCOM. Deliveries commenced in 1996.

== See also ==
- List of individual weapons of the U.S. Armed Forces
- MEU(SOC) pistol—the Marine equivalent
