= Wonder Nine =

Category of semi-automatic pistols

A Wonder Nine is a semi-automatic pistol chambered in 9×19mm Parabellum with a staggered column magazine and a double-action trigger for at least the first shot.

The term was coined by firearms author Robert Shimek, and became popular in American firearm-related magazines during the 1980s and 1990s by those advocating their use by police forces. At the time most American police departments were still using revolvers, with the majority chambered in either .38 Special or .357 Magnum.

The simplicity of being able to fire the first shot just by pulling the trigger (a prominent feature of double-action revolvers), larger ammunition capacity, and faster reloading of ammunition with the use of box magazines are the features of a semi-automatic pistol.

Examples include the Heckler & Koch VP70 (1970), Smith & Wesson Model 59 (1971), CZ 75 (1975), Star Model 28 (1975), Beretta 92 (1976), Steyr GB (1981), FN HP DA (1982), SIG Sauer P226 (1984), Ruger P85 (1985), Walther P88 (1988), IWI Jericho 941 (1990), Vektor SP1 (1992), Heckler & Koch USP (1993), Bersa Thunder 9 (1994), Walther P99 (1997), and Steyr M (1999).

The Glock 17 (1982) is a notable contemporary to the Wonder Nines, but its inclusion in the category is a subject of debate. Despite sharing several features, many consider the Glock design to be a distinct category.

== History ==
Prior to 1970, the only 9x19mm semi-automatic pistols with double-stack magazines available were the 13-round Browning Hi-Power (1935) and the 15-round MAB PA-15 (1966), both of which only had single-action triggers.

== Gallery ==
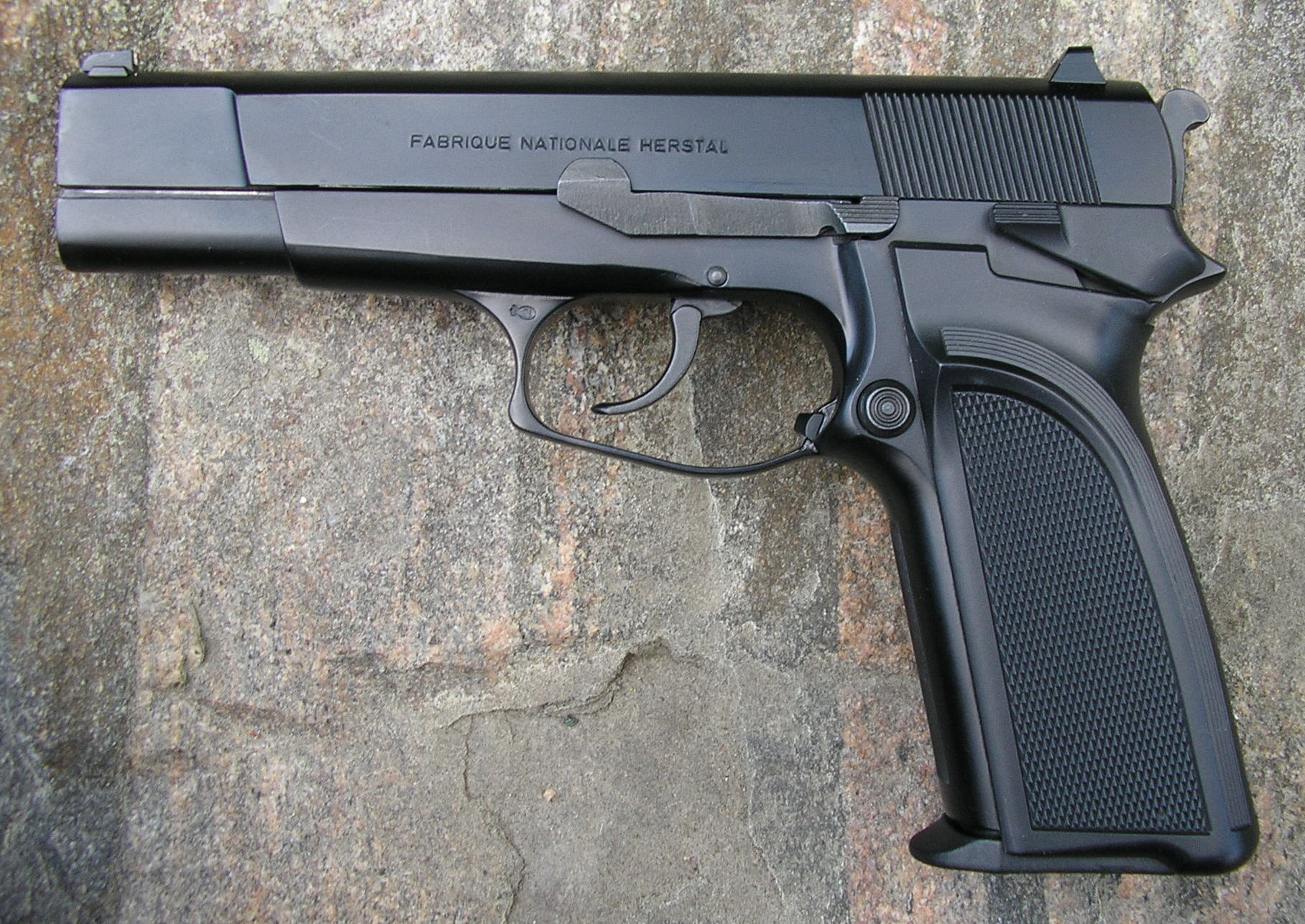
FN Browning BDA-9

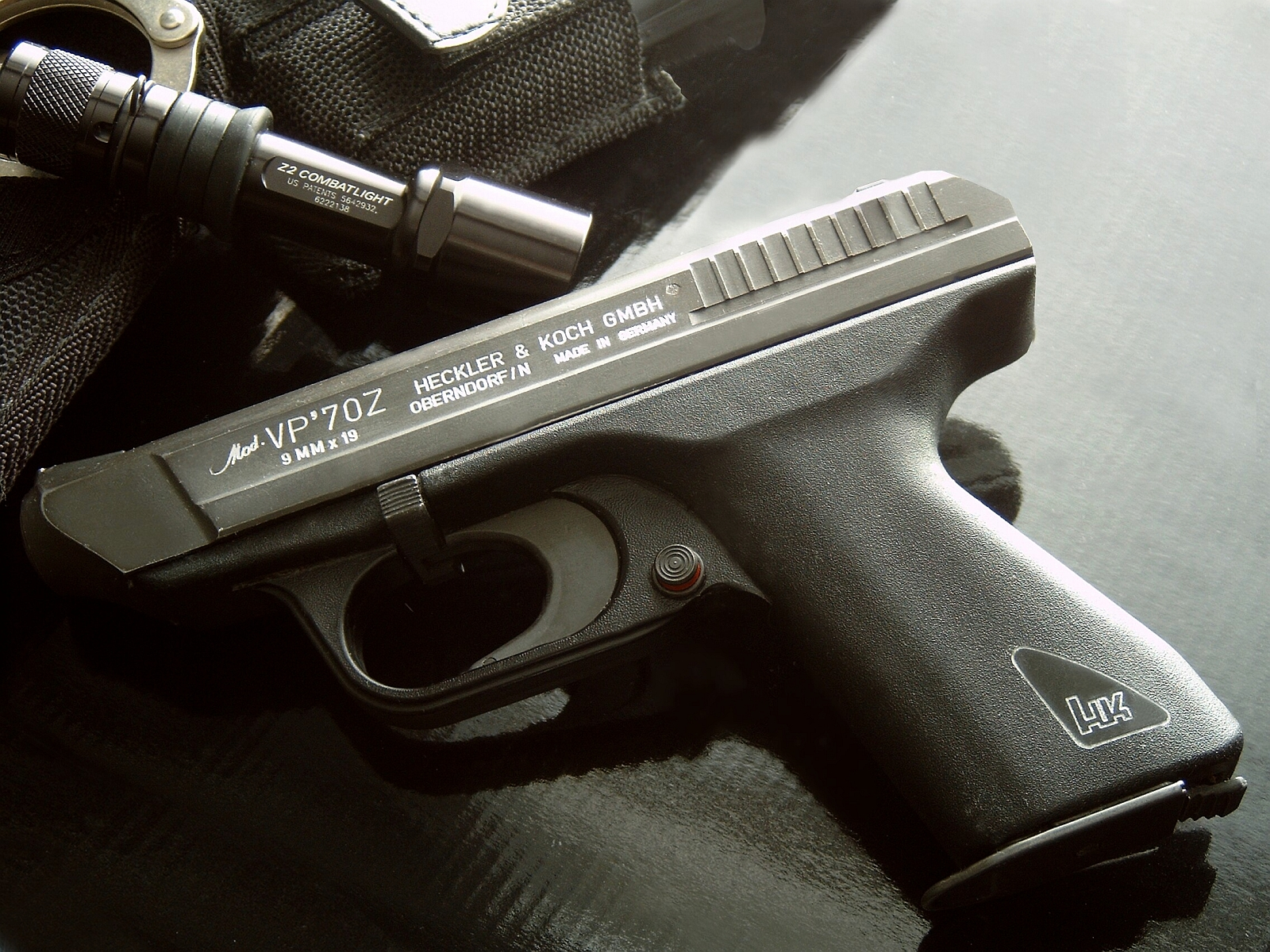
Heckler & Koch VP70

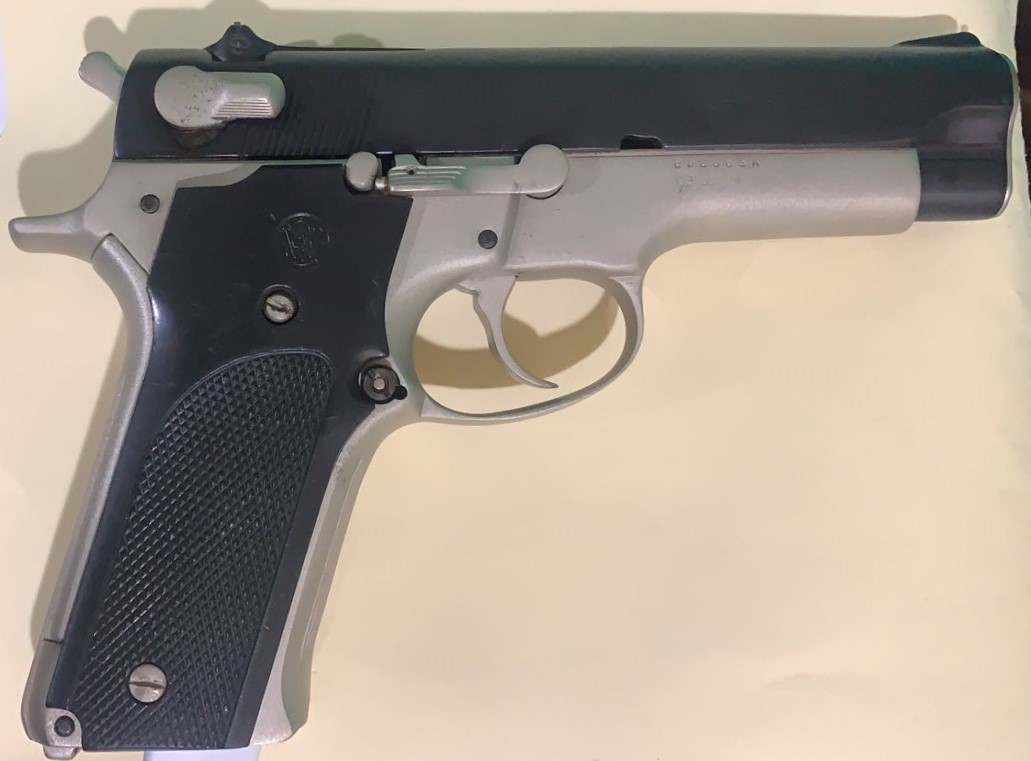
S&W Model 59

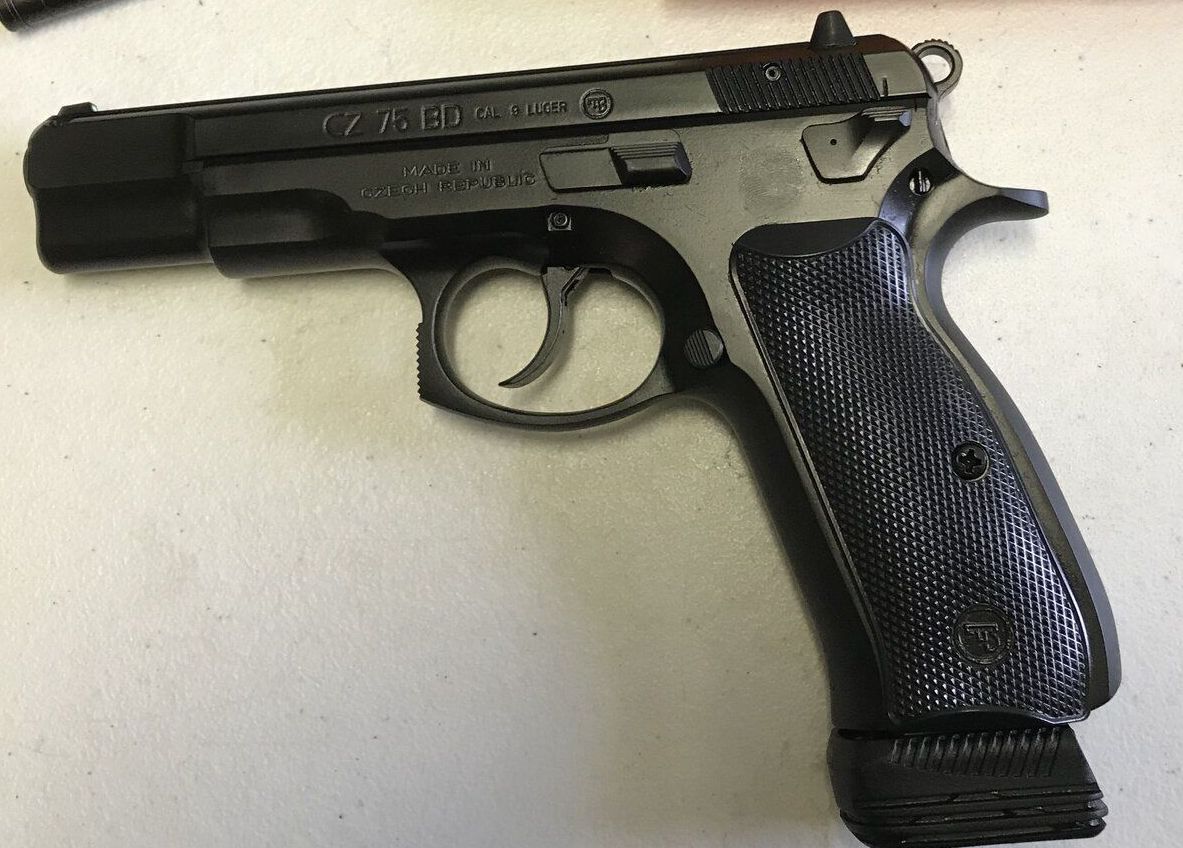
CZ 75BD variant, with 19-round magazine

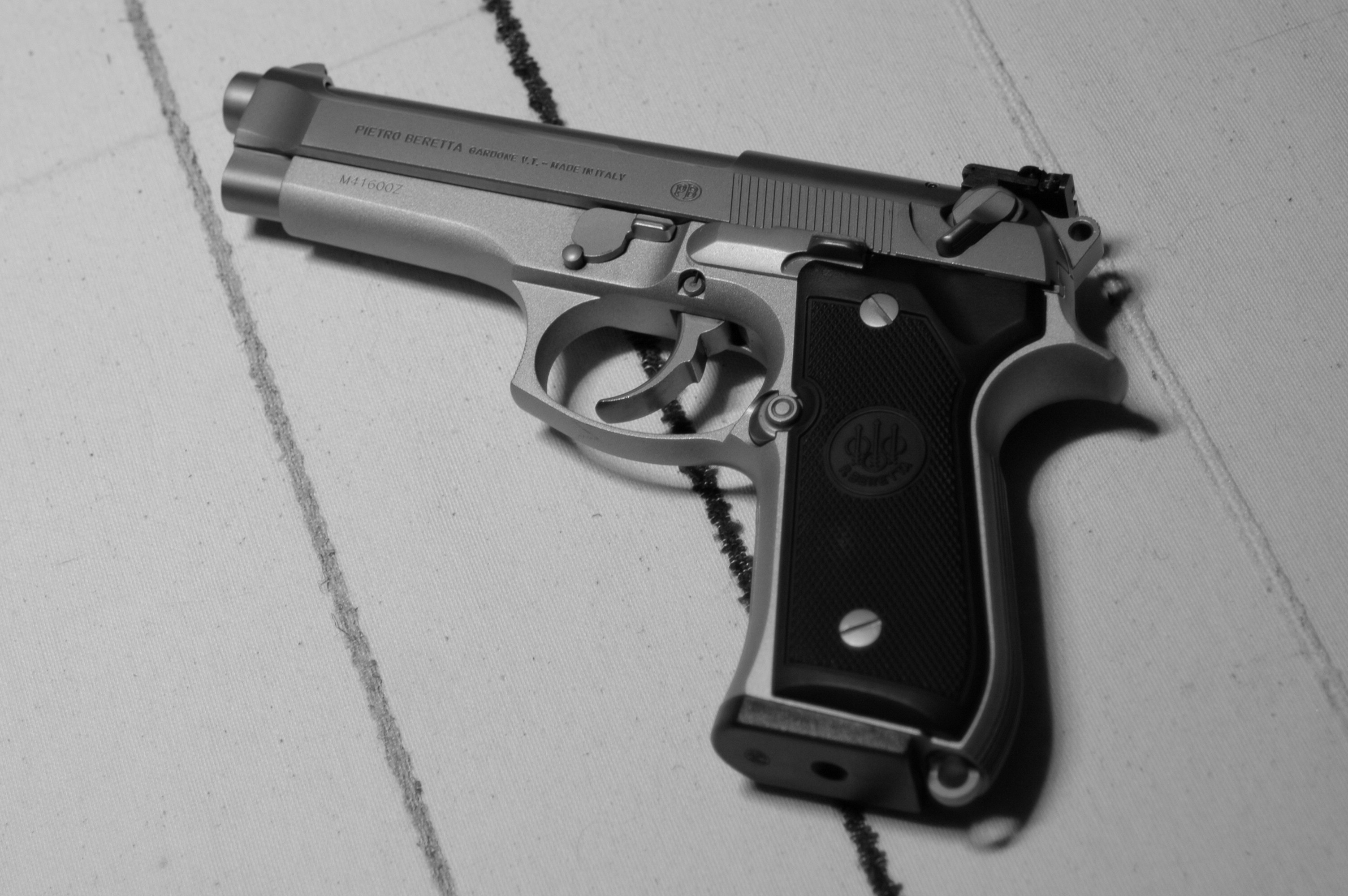
Beretta 92FS Inox stainless steel pistol

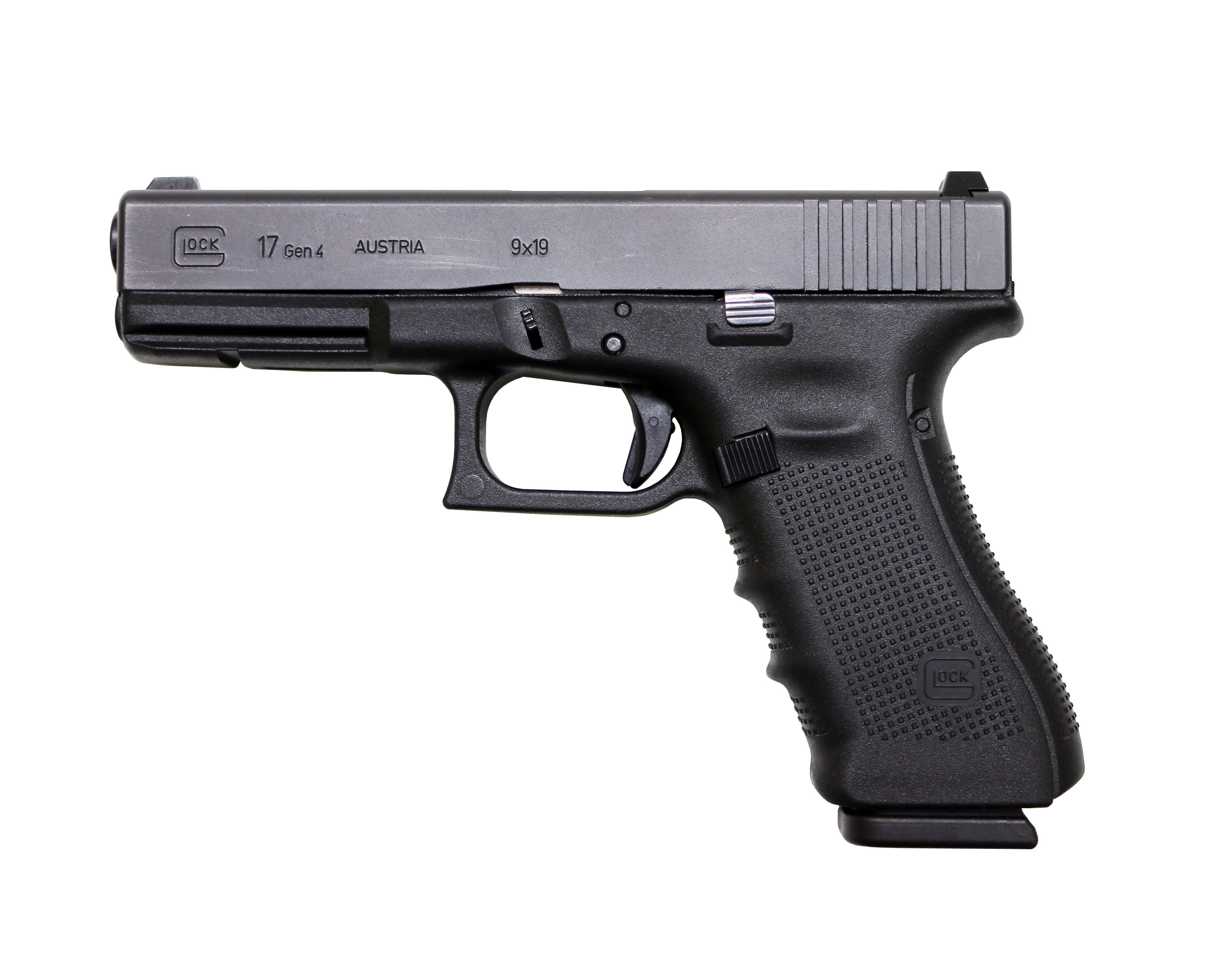
"Fourth-generation" Glock 17

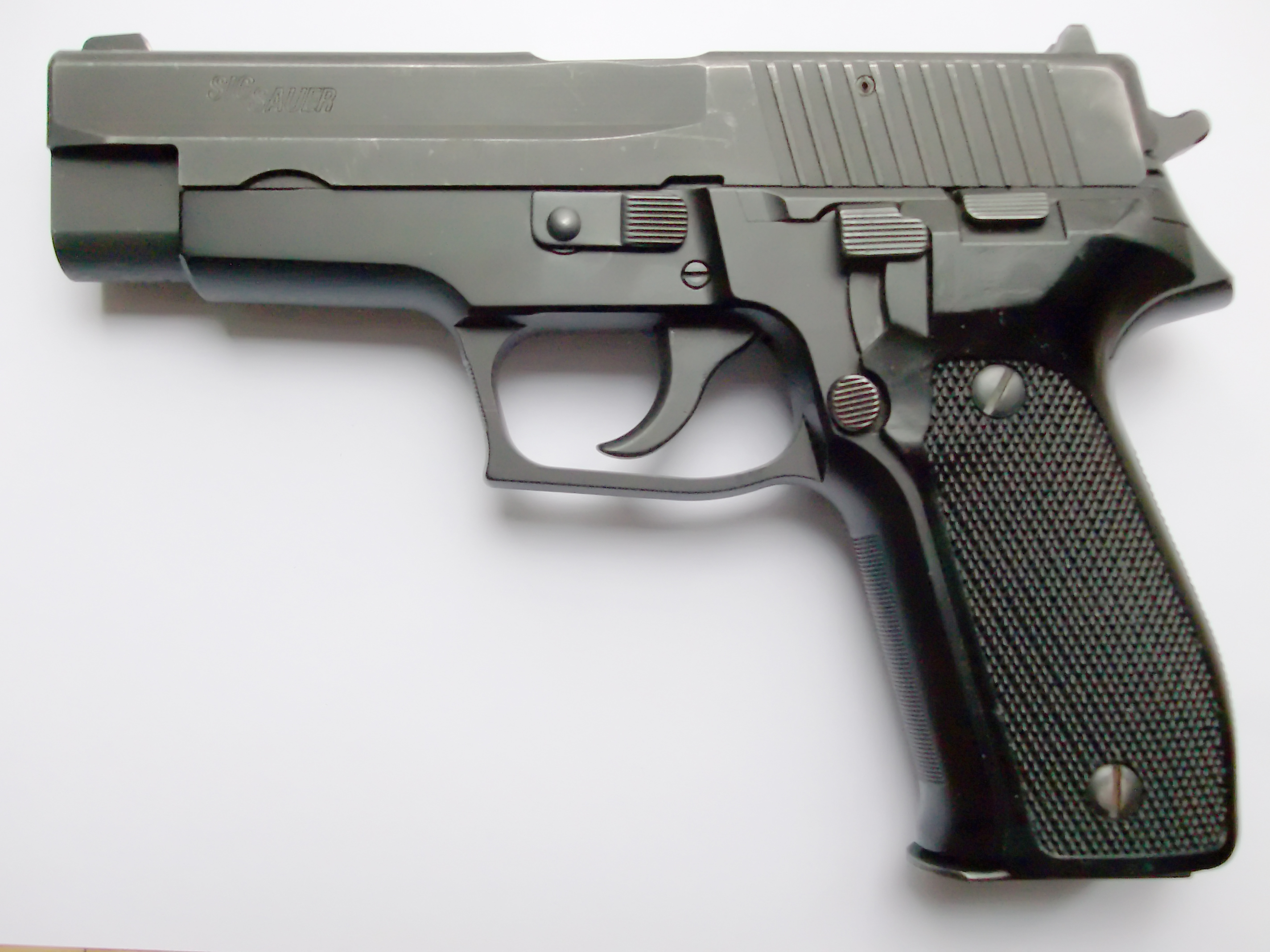
SIG Sauer P226 pistol

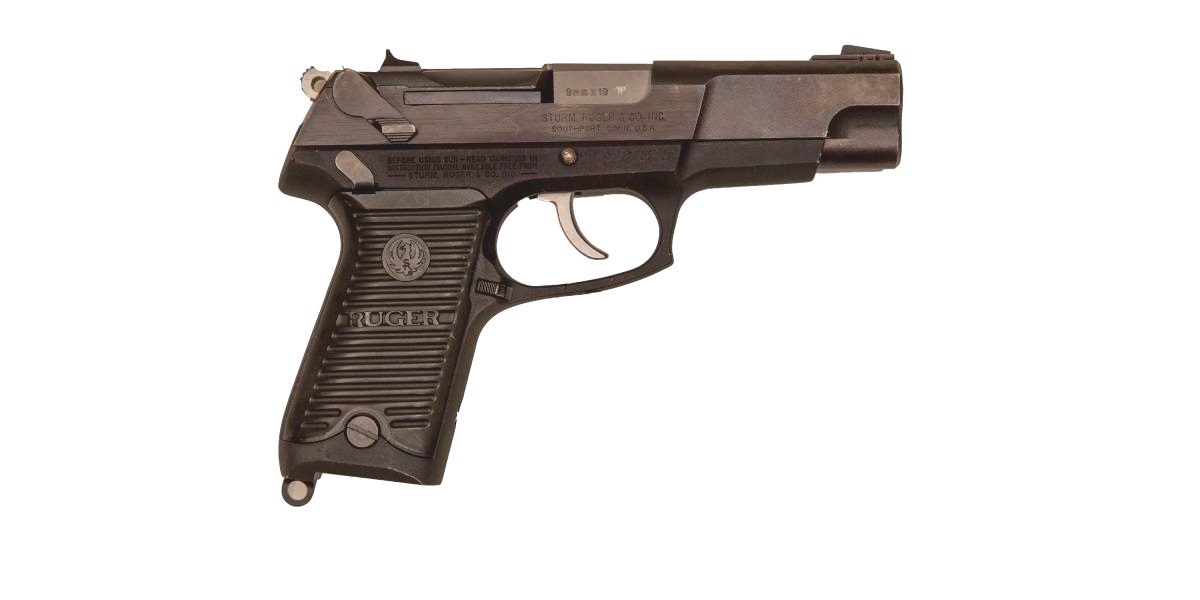
Ruger P89

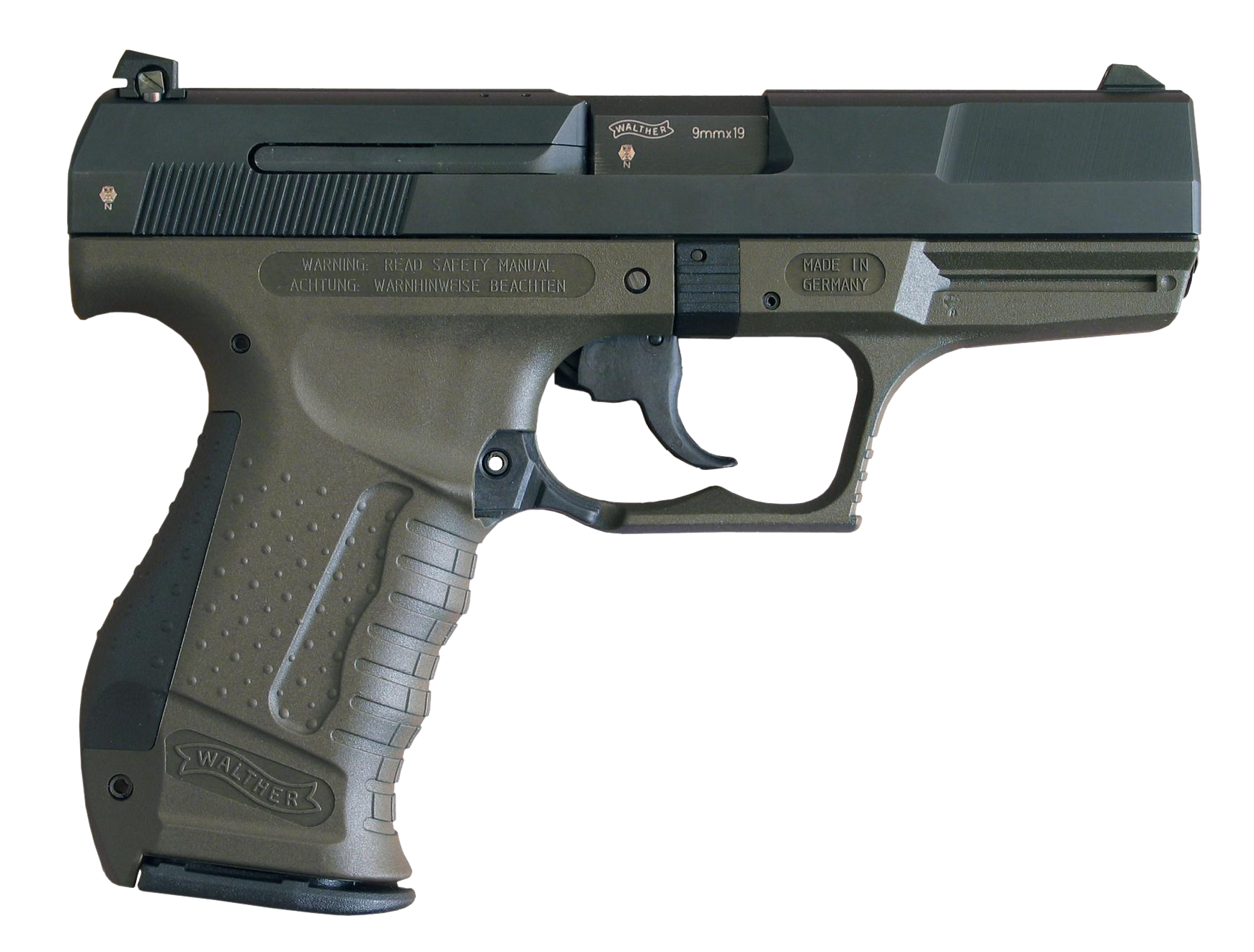
First generation Walther P99

== See also ==
- Machine pistol
