= List of firearms before the 20th century =

This is an extensive list of antique guns made before the year 1901 and including the first functioning firearms ever invented. The list is not comprehensive; create an entry for listings having none; multiple names are acceptable as cross-references, so that redirecting hyperlinks can be established for them.

== A ==
- Abus gun (Ottomans – howitzer)
- Agar machine gun (US – machine gun – 1861)
- Allen & Thurber Single-Shot (US – pistol – 1848)
- Allen & Wheelock Drop Breech (US – rifle – 1860)
- Apache revolver (Belgium – revolver – c.1869)
- Arisaka Type 30 rifle (Empire of Japan – rifle – 1897/1899)
- Arquebus (Dutch – 15th century)
- Augustin Infantry Musket Model 1842 (Austrian Empire – rifle – 1842)

== B ==
- Baker rifle (UK – muzzleloading rifle – 1800)
- Ballard Rifle (USA – rifle – 1862)
- Beaumont–Adams revolver (UK – revolver – 1862)
- Bedil (Nusantara – hand cannon – 14th century)
- Berdan rifle (USA/UK/Russian Empire (Note: Was designed by American Hiram Berdan. The first version, manufactured by Colt in the US, is known as model 1868, or Berdan I. The second version/Berdan II was initially produced at Birmingham Small Arms in England. The rifles were later manufactured in large numbers by Russian factories at Tula, Izhevsk, and Sestroretsk.) – rifle – 1868)
- Bergman No.-series pistols (German Empire – semi-automatic pistol)
  - Model 1894 (No. 1): 1894
  - Model 1896 (No. 2/3/4): 1896
  - Model 1897 (No. 5): 1897
- Berthier rifles (France – rifle – c. 1890)
- Blunderbuss
- Bodeo Model 1889 (Kingdom of Italy – revolver – 1889)
- Borchardt C-93 (German Empire – semi-automatic pistol – 1893)
- British Bull Dog revolver (UK – revolver – 1872)
- Brown Bess (UK – musket – 1722)
- Brunswick rifle (UK – rifle – 1836)
- Burnside carbine (USA – rifle – 1858)

== C ==
- Caliver (UK – arquebus – 17th century)
- Carcano Rifle (Kingdom of Italy – rifle – 1891)
- Chamelot Delvigne French 1873 (French – revolver – 1873)
- Charleville (French – musket – 1770s)
- Che Dian Chong (China – arquebus – 16th century)
- Coach gun (US – shotgun – 1850s)
- Colt's Manufacturing Company
  - Colt 1851 Navy (US – revolver – 1851)
  - Colt Army Model 1860 (US – revolver – 1860)
  - Colt Dragoon Revolver (US – revolver – 1848)
  - Colt House Revolver (US – revolver – 1871)
  - Colt Lightning Carbine (US – carbine – 1884)
  - Colt M1861 Navy (US – revolver – 1861)
  - Colt M1877 (US – revolver – 1877)
  - Colt M1878 "Frontier" (US – revolver – 1878)
  - Colt M1892 "New Army and Navy" (US – revolver – 1892)
  - Colt model 1839 carbine (USA – rifle – 1838)
  - Colt Model 1855 Sidehammer Pocket Revolver " Root Revolver" (USA – revolver – c.1855)
  - Colt Model 1871–72 Open Top (USA – revolver – 1871)
  - Colt New Line (USA – revolver – 1873)
  - Colt Open Top Pocket Model Revolver (USA – revolver – 1871)
  - Colt Paterson (US – revolver – 1836)
  - Colt Pocket Percussion Revolvers (USA – revolver)
    - Baby Dragoon: 1847
    - Pocket Model of 1849: 1850
    - Pocket Navy and Pocket Police: 1861
  - Colt revolving rifle (US – repeating rifle – 1855)
  - Colt ring lever rifle (first and second model) (US – caplock revolving rifle – 1837 and 1838)
  - Colt Single Action Army "Peacemaker" (US – revolver – 1873)
- Confederate Revolving Cannon

== D ==
- Derringer (USA - small handgun)
  - Philadelphia Deringer: 1852
  - Colt Deringer: 1861
  - Sharps Deringer: 1859
  - Remington Deringer (Model 95): 1866
- Dreyse Model 1841 "Needle Gun" (Kingdom of Prussia – rifle – 1841)

== E ==
- Enfield Revolver (UK – revolver – 1880)
- Evans Repeating Rifle (US – rifle – 1879-2001

== F ==
- Ferguson rifle (British breech-loading rifle - patented December of 1776)
- Fayetteville rifle (CSA – rifle – 1862)
- Frank Wesson Rifles (USA – rifle – 1858/1861)
- Fusil modèle 1866 "Chassepot" (France – rifle – 1866)
- Fusil Gras mle 1874 (France – rifle – 1874)

== G ==
- Gallager carbine (USA – rifle – 1861)
- Gatling Model 1861 (USA – machine gun – 1862)
- Gewehr 1888 / Model 1888 commission rifle (German Empire – rifle – 1888)
- Gorgas machine gun
- Guycot pistol
- Guycot rifle

== H ==
- Harpers Ferry Armory
  - Harpers Ferry Model 1803 (USA – rifle – 1803)
  - Harpers Ferry Model 1805 (USA – flintlock pistol – 1805)
  - Harpers Ferry Model 1816 (USA – rifle – 1816)
  - Harpers Ferry Model 1819 "Hall Rifle" (USA – rifle – c.1820)
  - Harpers Ferry Model 1841 "Mississippi Rifle" (USA – rifle – 1841)
  - Harpers Ferry Model 1855 (USA – rifle – 1857)
- Heilongjiang hand cannon (China – hand cannon – c. 1288; oldest known surviving firearm)
- Henry Repeating Rifle (US – rifle – 1850s-1866)
- Huochong (China – hand cannon – 13th century)
- Hinawaju (Japan – arquebus and pistol – 16th century?)

== I ==
- Istinggar (Nusantara – arquebus – 16th century)

== J ==
- Jarmann M1884 (Norway – rifle – 1878/1884)
- Java arquebus (Nusantara – arquebus – 16th century)
- Joslyn rifle (USA – rifle – 1855)

== K ==
- Kerr's Patent Revolver (United Kingdom – revolver – 1859)
- Kropatschek (Austria-Hungary – rifle – 1881)
- Krag–Petersson (Norway – rifle – 1872)
- Krag–Jørgensen (Norway – rifle – 1886)

== L ==
- Lancaster pistol (UK – multi-barrel pistol – c. 1860)
- Lebel 1886 (France – rifle – 1886)
- Lee-Metford – MLM (UK – rifle – 1884)
- Lee-Enfield - MLE (UK – rifle – 1895)
- Lefaucheux M1854 (France – revolver – 1854)
- Lefaucheux M1858 (France – revolver – 1858)
- Lefaucheux-Francotte M. 71 (Belgium – revolver – 1871)
- LeMat Revolver (France/CSA – revolver – 1856)
- Lorenz rifle (Austrian Empire – rifle – 1855)

== M ==
- M1867 Werndl–Holub rifle (Austria-Hungary – rifle – 1867)
- M1870 Gasser (Austria-Hungary – revolver – 1870)
- M1871 Beaumont (Netherlands – rifle – 1869/1871)
- M1879 Reichsrevolver (German Empire – revolver – 1879)
- M1882 Revolver (Switzerland – revolver – 1882)
- M1895 Colt–Browning machine gun "Potato Digger" (USA – heavy machine gun – c.1895)
- M1895 Lee Navy (USA – rifle, bolt-action – 1895)
- Mannlicher
  - Mannlicher M1886 (Austria-Hungary – rifle – 1886)
  - Mannlicher M1888 (Austria-Hungary – rifle – 1888)
  - Mannlicher M1890 carbine (Austria-Hungary – 1891)
  - Mannlicher M1894 (German Empire – pistol – 1894)
  - Mannlicher M1895 (Austria-Hungary – rifle – 1895)
- Marlin Model 1894 (USA – rifle – 1894)
- Mars Automatic Pistol (United Kingdom – pistol – 1897)
- Martini–Henry Mark I, II, III, and IV (United Kingdom – rifle – 1871)
- Massachusetts Arms Maynard Carbine (USA – rifle – 1851)
- Mauser
  - Gewehr 71 (German Empire – rifle – 1871)
  - Gewehr 98 (German Empire – rifle – 1898)
  - Mauser C78 "zig-zag" (German Empire – revolver – 1878)
  - Mauser C96 (German Empire – pistol – 1896)
- Maxim Gun (United Kingdom – machine gun – 1883)
- Merrill carbine (USA – rifle – 1858/1863)
- Merwin & Hulbert revolvers (USA – revolver – 1876)
- Mitrailleuse (France – volley/machine gun – 1851)
- Model 1814 common rifle (USA – rifle – c. 1814)
- Model 1817 common rifle "Deringer" (USA – rifle – 1817)
- Model 1872 Revolver / Ordonnanzrevolver 1872 (Switzerland – revolver – c. 1872)
- Modèle 1873 revolver "Chamelot-Delvigne" (France – revolver – 1873)
- Modèle 1892 revolver "Lebel" (France – revolver – 1892)
- Morse gun (CSA – machine gun – )
- Mosin–Nagant (Russian Empire – rifle – 1891)
- Murata rifle (Empire of Japan – rifle – 1880)

== N ==
- Nagant M1895 (Belgium/Russian Empire – revolver – 1895)
- Nordenfelt gun (Sweden – machine gun)

== O ==
- Ōdzutsu (Japan - hand cannon - 15th century)

== P ==
- Palmer Model 1865 (USA – rifle – 1865)
- Pattern 1853 Enfield (UK – rifle – 1853)
- Pattern 1861 Enfield musketoon (UK – rifle – 1861)
- Pattern 1800 Infantry Rifle (UK – muzzleloading rifle – 1800)
- Petronel (arquebus – 16th century)
- Potzdam Muskets (Kingdom of Prussia – rifle – 1723)

== R ==
- Rast & Gasser M1898 (Austria-Hungary – revolver – 1898)
- Remington
  - Remington–Keene rifle (USA – rifle – c.1878)
  - Remington–Lee rifles (USA – rifle – 1879)
  - Remington M1867 (USA/Norway/Sweden – rifle – 1867)
  - Remington Model 1858 (USA – revolver – 1862)
  - Remington Model 1875 (USA – revolver – 1875)
  - Remington Model 1890 (USA – revolver – 1890)
  - Remington Naval Model 1865 Pistol (USA – pistol – 1866)
  - Remington-Beals Pocket Revolver (USA – revolver)
    - 1st Model: 1853
    - 2nd Model: 1858
    - 3rd Model: 1859
  - Remington Rider Single Shot Pistol (USA – pistol – 1860)
  - Remington Rolling Block rifle (USA – rifle – 1860s)
  - Remington Zig-Zag Derringer (USA – pistol – 1861)
- Richmond rifle (CSA – rifle – 1861)
- Ribauldequin (UK – 1339)
- Roper repeating shotgun (USA - shotgun - 1867)

== S ==
- Savage 1861 Navy (USA – rifle – 1861)
- Salvator-Dormus M1893 (Austria-Hungary – heavy machine gun – 8×50mmR)
- Salvator Dormus pistol (Austria-Hungary – pistol –1891/1895)
- San Yan Chong (China – hand cannon – 16th century)
- Slocum revolver (US – revolver – 1863/1865)
- Schmidt M1882 (Switzerland – revolver)
- Schmidt–Rubin rifles (Switzerland – rifle – 1889/1896)
- Schwarzlose Model 1898 (German Empire – semi-automatic pistol – 1898)
- Sharps Rifle (US – rifle – 1848)
- Sharps & Hankins Model 1862 carbine (US – rifle – 1862)
- Schwarzlose Model 1898 (Austria-Hungary – pistol – 1898)
- Schönberger-Laumann (Austria-Hungary – pistol – 1892)
- Smith & Wesson
  - Smith & Wesson Model 1 (US – revolver – 1857)
  - Smith & Wesson Model 1 1/2 (US – revolver – 1865)
  - Smith & Wesson Model 2 (US – revolver – 1876)
  - Smith & Wesson No. 3 Revolver (US – revolver – 1870)
    - Schofield Model 3 (US – revolver – 1875)
  - Smith & Wesson Model No. 2 Army (US – revolver – 1861)
  - Smith & Wesson .38 Hand Ejector Model of 1899 (US – revolver – 1899)
  - Smith & Wesson Model 320 Revolving Rifle (US – rifle, revolving – 1879)
  - Smith & Wesson Safety Hammerless (US – revolver – 1887)
- Smith carbine (USA – rifle – 1857)
- Spencer 1882 (US - shotgun - 1882)
- Spencer Rifle (US – rifle – 1860)
- Springfield Armory
  - Springfield Model 1795 Musket (US – rifle – 1795)
  - Springfield Model 1816 (US – rifle – 1816)
  - Springfield Model 1842 (US – rifle – 1844)
  - Springfield Model 1855 (US – rifle – 1855)
  - Springfield Model 1861 (US – rifle – 1861)
  - Springfield Model 1863 (US – rifle – 1863)
  - Springfield Model 1865 (US – rifle – 1865)
  - Springfield Model 1866 (US – rifle – 1866)
  - Springfield Model 1868 (US – rifle – 1868)
  - Springfield Model 1871 (US – rifle – 1871)
  - Springfield Model 1873 (US – rifle – 1873)
- Starr revolver (US – revolver – c. 1858)

== T ==
- Tarpley carbine (CSA – rifle – 1863)
- Tranter revolver (USA – revolver – c. 1854)
- Type 26 revolver (Empire of Japan – revolver – 1893)

== V ==
- Velo-dog (France – revolver – 1894)
- Vetterli rifle - (Switzerland – rifle – 1867/1869)
- Volcanic Repeating Arms (US – rifle & pistol – 1855–56)

== W ==
- Walch Revolver (US – revolver – c. 1858)
- Walker Colt (Note: This revolver was primarily manufactured by Eli Whitney, Jr. at Whitneyville, Connecticut and not Samuel Colt's Patent Arms Company in Paterson, New Jersey.) (US – revolver –1847)
- Webley Longspur (UK – revolver – 1853)
- Webley Revolver (Note: Mark I to IV, with Mark V adopted in 1913 and the special Webley Mk IV .38/200 Service Revolver designed/adopted in 1932.) (UK – revolver – 1887)
- Werder pistol model 1869 (Bavaria – pistol – 1869)
- Whitworth rifle (UK – rifle – 1857)
- Winchester Repeating Arms Company
  - Winchester Hotchkiss (USA – rifle – 1878)
  - Winchester Model 1885 (US – rifle – 1885)
  - Winchester Model 1887 (US – shotgun – 1887)
  - Winchester Model 1890 (US – rifle – 1890)
  - Winchester Model 1893 (US – shotgun – 1893)
  - Winchester Model 1897 (US – shotgun – 1897)
  - Winchester rifle series (US – rifle – first model 1866)
    - Model 1866
    - Model 1873
    - Model 1876
    - Model 1886
    - Model 1892
    - Model 1894
    - Model 1895

== See also ==
- List of firearms
  - List of World War II firearms
  - List of pistols
- Antique gun
