= List of assassinations by firearm =

The following is a list of assassinations by firearm detailing the firearms used in the killings of politicians and key social and cultural figures.

Year	Location of attack	Victim	Attacker	Weapon	Notes
1536	London, England	Robert Pakington, Member of Parliament	Unknown	Wheellock pistol	Believed by some to be the first political assassination ever to be performed with a firearm.
1570	Linlithgow, Scotland	James Stewart, 1st Earl of Moray, Regent of Scotland	James Hamilton of Bothwellhaugh	Matchlock carbine	
1584	Delft, Netherlands	William the Silent, Prince of Orange	Balthasar Gerard	Wheellock pistol	
1792	Stockholm, Sweden	Gustav III. King of Sweden	Jacob Johan Anckarström	Flintlock pistol	
1812	London, United Kingdom	Prime Minister Spencer Perceval	John Bellingham	Screw-barrel .50 caliber flint-lock pistol	The only British prime minister to be assassinated. Bellingham bought a pair of half-inch bore pistols from gunsmith W. Beckwith of Snow Hill, for four guineas.
1830	São Paulo, São Paulo Province, Empire of Brazil	Libero Bardaró	Disputed	Blunderbuss	
1859	Lake Merced, United States	Senator David C. Broderick	David S. Terry	.58 caliber pistol	Killed in a duel after his pistol failed to fire.
1865	Washington, D.C., United States	President Abraham Lincoln	John Wilkes Booth	.44 calibre muzzleloading derringer by Henry Deringer	
1868	Ottawa, Canada	Thomas D'Arcy McGee	MP Patrick J. Whelan	.32 rimfire Smith & Wesson Army revolver	
1880	Toronto, Canada	George Brown, Premier of Canada West	George Bennett (murderer)	"Colt revolver"	
1881	Washington, D.C., United States	President James A. Garfield	Charles Guiteau	.44 caliber British bulldog revolver	
1882	Baldwyn, United States	W. H. H. Tison, Speaker of the Mississippi House of Representatives	J. Edward Sanders	"Double-barrel shotgun"	Killed in retaliation for an alleged assault by his brother S. H. Tison.
1896	(Pahlavi dynasty) Tehran, Persia	Shah Naser al-Din Shah Qajar of Persia	Mirza Reza Kermani	Revolver	
1897	Madrid, Spain	Prime Minister Antonio Cánovas del Castillo	Michele Angiolillo	11.17mm Webley British Bulldog revolver	
1897	Rio de Janeiro, Federal District of Brazil, Brazil	Carlos Machado de Bittencourt	Marcelino Bispo de Melo	Garrucha	
1900	Monza, Italy	King Umberto I of Italy	Gaetano Bresci	.32 S&W Iver-Johnson revolver	
1901	Buffalo, United States	President William McKinley	Leon Czolgosz	.32 S&W Iver-Johnson revolver	Czolgosz purchased the weapon only three days prior to the assassination, for $4.50 (about $159.00 U.S. dollars in 2023 currency)) in a hardware store in Buffalo (the site of the attack). Newspaper clippings Czolgosz had collected prior noted that this particular model had been used by anarchist Gaetano Bresci to assassinate King Umberto I of Italy.
1903	Belgrade, Serbia	King Alexander I of Serbia	Mihailo Ristić-Džervinac	Revolver	
1904	(Russia) Helsinki, Grand Duchy of Finland	General Nikolay Bobrikov	Eugen Schauman	FN Browning M1900	
1907	Sofia, Bulgaria	Prime Minister Dimitar Petkov	Alexander Petrov	Pistol	
1908	Lisbon, Portugal	King Carlos I of Portugal	Manuel Buíça	Winchester Model 1907 semi-automatic carbine chambered in .351 WSL	Serial number 2137, imported from Germany by Heitor Ferreira.
1908	Rio Branco, Acre, Brazil	José Plácido de Castro	Unknown	Firearm	
1909	London, United Kingdom	Curzon Wyllie	Madan Lal Dhingra	Colt revolver	
1909	Harbin, China	Resident-General Itō Hirobumi	An Jung-geun	FN M1900 pistol	
1910	Cairo, Egypt	Prime Minister Boutros Ghali	Ibrahim Nassif al-Wardani		
1913	Thessaloniki, Greece	King George I of Greece	Alexandros Schinas	Revolver.	
1914	Sarajevo, Austria-Hungary	Archduke Franz Ferdinand of Austria	Gavrilo Princip	FN M1910 .380 ACP pistol	A letter dated April 2012 from Thomas Ilming, curator Waffen und Technik, Vienna Military Museum, who holds the actual Belgium made Browning (FN) M1910 semi-auto pistol caliber .380 ACP (9mm Kurz) s/n 19074 used by Princip. This semi-automatic pistol design allows the interchangeable barrels/receiver either 9mm Kurz or 7.65mm which probably creates some confusion as to caliber, some references state .32 ACP (7.65mm). Letter from the Museum in Vienna states emphatically that the caliber of the assassination weapon was 9mm Kurz.
1918	Lisbon, Portugal	President Sidónio Pais	José Júlio da Costa	Pistol	
1919	Ciudad Ayala, Mexico	General Emiliano Zapata	Jesús Guajardo and subordinates	Several rifles	Guajardo was an officer in the Mexican Army who, on the orders of General Pablo González Garza, was ordered to pretend to lead his men to defect to Zapata's forces, and then kill Zapata. The assassination was therefore carried out with Guajardo's soldiers' service rifles.
1922	Berlin, Germany	Foreign Minister Walther Rathenau	Erwin Kern	MP 18 submachine gun	
1922	Warsaw, Poland	President Gabriel Narutowicz	Eligiusz Niewiadomski	Revolver	
1923	Prague, Czechoslovakia	Minister for Finance Alois Rašín	Josef Šoupal	6.35mm Browning-design pistol	
1929	Bauru, São Paulo, Brazil	José Gomes Duarte	Moacir de Almeida	Pistol	
1929	Rio de Janeiro, Federal District of Brazil, Brazil	Manuel Francisco de Sousa Filho	Ildefonso Simões Lopes	Firearm	
1930	Recife, Pernambuco, Brazil	João Pessoa Cavalcânti de Albuquerque	João Duarte Dantas	Revolver	
1932	Paris, France	President Paul Doumer	Paul Gorguloff	FN Model 1910	
1933	Miami, United States	Anton Cermak, mayor of Chicago, during possible attempted assassination of Franklin D. Roosevelt	Giuseppe Zangara	.32 S&W revolver by the United States Revolver Company	On arriving in Miami, Zangara purchased the revolver for $8 from a pawnshop, along with ten cartridges.
1933	Lima, Peru	President Luis Miguel Sánchez Cerro	Abelardo de Mendoza	Browning semi-automatic pistol	
1934	Vienna, Austria	Chancellor Engelbert Dollfuss	Otto Planetta	Firearm	
1934	Marseille, France	King Alexander I of Yugoslavia	Vlado Chernozemski	Mauser pistol	
1934	Leningrad, Soviet Union	Sergei Kirov	Leonid Nikolayev	Nagant M1895 revolver	
1935	Baton Rouge, United States	Senator Huey Long	Carl Weiss	FN Model 1910 .32 ACP semi-auto pistol	
1938	Poço Redondo, Sergipe, Brazil	Virgulino Ferreira da Silva "Lampião"	Unknown	Bergmann MP-35 submachine gun	
1938	Poço Redondo, Sergipe, Brazil	Maria Gomes de Oliveira "Maria Bonita"	José Panta de Godoy	Bergmann MP-35 submachine gun	
1938	Paris, France	Ernst vom Rath	Herschel Grynszpan	6.35mm five-shot "hammerless" revolver	Purchased for 210 francs and a box of 25 bullets for 35 francs.
1940	London, United Kingdom	Michael O'Dwyer	Udham Singh	Smith & Wesson Triple Lock revolver	Singh had purchased the revolver from a soldier in a pub.
1942	Algiers, French Algeria	Admiral François Darlan	Fernand Bonnier de La Chapelle	7.65mm French "Ruby" pistol	
1944	Cairo, Egypt	Resident Minister Lord Moyne	Eliyahu Hakim	Nagant revolver	
1948	New Delhi, India	Mahatma Gandhi	Nathuram Godse	.380 ACP Beretta 1934 pistol	
1951	(Jordan) East Jerusalem, West Bank	King Abdullah I of Jordan	Mustafa Shukri Ashu	Revolver	
1951	Rawalpindi, Pakistan	Prime Minister Liaquat Ali Khan	Sayyid Akbar Babrak	Mauser C96	
1959	(Sri Lanka) Colombo, Ceylon	Prime Minister S. W. R. D. Bandaranaike	Talduwe Somarama Thero	.45 Webley Mark VI revolver	
1963	Jackson, United States	Medgar Evers	Byron De La Beckwith	M1917 Enfield	
1963	Dallas, United States	President John F. Kennedy	Lee Harvey Oswald	Italian military rifle, 6.5mm Carcano Model 91/38	
1964	Ceres, Goiás, Brazil	Adib Shishakli	Nawaf Ghazaleh	Pistol	
1965	New York City, United States	Malcolm X	Talmadge Hayer, William 25X Bradley, and others	one sawed off shotgun, M1911A1 and another semi automatic handgun	
1968	Memphis, United States	Martin Luther King Jr.	James Earl Ray	Remington 760 Gamemaster chambered in .30-06 Springfield	Ray initially purchased an identical model in .243 Winchester, but returned it as too weak for his purposes.
1968	Los Angeles, United States	Senator Robert F. Kennedy	Sirhan Sirhan	Eight-shot Iver Johnson .22 calibre Cadet 55-A revolver	Serial number H-53725, Trial-People's Exhibit #6, misidentified in trial testimony as S/N H-18602
1969	Las Anod, Somalia	President Abdirashid Ali Shermarke	Bodyguard	"Automatic rifle"	
1975	Riyadh, Saudi Arabia	King Faisal of Saudi Arabia	Faisal bin Musaid	Revolver	
1978	San Francisco, United States	George Moscone and Harvey Milk	Dan White	.38 Special S&W Chiefs Special snub-nosed revolver	White, a former policeman, wielded the revolver he used to carry on the job.
1979	Seoul, South Korea	President Park Chung-hee	Kim Jae-gyu	Walther PPK .32 ACP and Smith & Wesson Model 36 .38 Special	After his Walther PPK jammed, Kim retrieved a .38 revolver from his subordinate to kill Park.
1980	New York City, United States	John Lennon	Mark Chapman	.38 Special Charter Arms snubnosed revolver	Purchased at J&S Sales in Honolulu, Hawaii for $169
1981	Cairo, Egypt	President Anwar El Sadat	Khalid Islambouli and co-conspirators	Egyptian-issue AK-47 rifles	One of the guns used in the killing had "In the name of Allah the avenger" inscribed on its barrel.
1983	Manila, Philippines	Ninoy Aquino	Disputed	Smith & Wesson .357 Magnum revolver	It was reported that the manufacturer had shipped the pistol to the Thai National Trading Co. in Bangkok on September 25, 1970.
1984	Denver, United States	Alan Berg	Members of the white nationalist group The Order	Ingram MAC-10 pistol	The gun was illegally converted from semi to fully automatic
1984	New Delhi, India	Prime Minister Indira Gandhi	Bodyguards Satwant Singh and Beant Singh	.38 Special service revolver, 9mm SAF carbine (Indian-produced Sterling submachine gun)	Beant fired five shots from his service revolver, and Satwant followed with 25 shots of the carbine.
1986	Stockholm, Sweden	Prime Minister Olof Palme	Unknown	.357 Magnum revolver	The shooter was never identified.
1986	Imperatriz, Maranhão, Brazil	Josimo Morais Tavares	Geraldo Rodrigues da Costa	Firearm	
1988	Xapuri, Acre, Brazil	Francisco Alves "Chico" Mendes Filho	Darci Alves da Silva	20-gauge shotgun (maker and model unknown)	
1992	São Paulo, São Paulo, Brazil	Governor Edmundo Pinto	Unknown	Firearm	
1992	Annaba, Algeria	President-elect Mohamed Boudiaf	Lambarek Boumaarafi	Submachine gun	
1993	Boksburg, South Africa	Chris Hani	Janusz Waluś	Z-88 9mm pistol	
1994	Tijuana, Mexico	Luis Donaldo Colosio Murrieta	Mario Aburto Martínez (disputed)	.38 Taurus Model 85 revolver	Colosio was gunned down after a campaign speech rally in the Lomas Tairinas neighborhood of Tijuana. Police and government officials put Aburto as the main shooter but the latter claims others were involved but were never questioned.
1994	Kigali, Rwanda	Prime Minister Agathe Uwilingiyimana	Members of the FAR	Unknown	Her assassination was ordered by Colonel Théoneste Bagosora.
1995	Corpus Christi, Texas, United States	Selena Quintanilla-Pérez	Yolanda Saldívar	.38 Taurus Model 85 revolver	
1995	Tel Aviv, Israel	Prime Minister Yitzhak Rabin	Yigal Amir	Beretta 84F semi-automatic pistol	
1996	Maceió, Alagoas, Brazil	Paulo César Farias	Unknown	Rossi model 874 .38 Special revolver	
1996	Las Vegas, Nevada, United States	Tupac Shakur	Unknown	.40 caliber Glock 22 pistol	
1998	Cookeville, Tennessee, United States	Tommy Burks	Byron Looper	9mm pistol	
1999	Yerevan, Armenia	Prime Minister Vazgen Sargsyan	Nairi Hunanyan and co-conspirators	Kalashnikov AK-47 rifle	
2000	Athens, Greece	Brigadier Stephen Saunders	Members of the Marxist group 17 November	.45 Colt M1911 pistol	
2000	Decatur, Georgia, United States	Derwin Brown	Melvin Walker	Intratec TEC-9	His assassination was ordered by Sidney Dorsey
2001	(Democratic Republic of the Congo) Kinshasa, Democratic Republic of Congo	President Laurent-Désiré Kabila	Rashidi Mizele	Revolver	
2001	Campinas, São Paulo, Brazil	Antonio da Costa Santos	Unknown	Firearm	
2001	Governador Dix-Sept Rosado, Rio Grande do Norte, Brazil	Aguinaldo Pereira da Silva	Disputed	AR-15-style rifle	
2002	Juquitiba, São Paulo, Brazil	Celso Daniel	Unknown	Firearm	
2002	Hilversum, Netherlands	Pim Fortuyn	Volkert van der Graaf	Star Firestar semi-automatic pistol	
2003	Belgrade, Serbia and Montenegro	Prime Minister Zoran Đinđić	Zvezdan Jovanović	Heckler & Koch G3 rifle	Fired from a window 180m away.
2004	Amsterdam, Netherlands	Theo van Gogh	Mohammed Bouyeri	HS2000 semi-automatic pistol	
2004	Columbus, Ohio, United States	"Dimebag" Darrell Abbott	Nathan Gale	Beretta 92FS pistol	
2005	Anapu, Pará, Brazil	Dorothy Stang	Raifran das Neves Sales	Firearm	
2009	Dubai, United Arab Emirates	Sulim Yamadayev	Unknown	Makarov pistol	The gold-plated pistol was left at the scene.
2010	Jandira, São Paulo, Brazil	Walderi Braz Paschoalin	Unknown	AK-47	
2011	Caloocan, Philippines	Reynaldo Dagsa	Arnel Buenaflor	9mm pistol	The pistol was sold back to the dealer the day after the murder.
2012	Bayamon, Puerto Rico	Hector "Macho" Camacho	Five people have been arrested and accused of his murder	Firearm	
2015	Belfast, United Kingdom	Gerard "Jock" Davison	Unknown	Makarov pistol	The PSNI reported that the use of a Makarov was "unusual"
2016	Orlando, Florida, United States	Christina Grimmie	Kevin Loibl	Glock 19 Gen 4 9mm pistol	
2016	Birstall, United Kingdom	Jo Cox	Thomas Mair	Sawed-off Weihrauch .22 rifle	
2016	Itumbiara, Goiás, Brazil	José Gomes da Rocha	Gilberto Ferreira do Amaral	Pistol	
2016	Ankara, Turkey	Andrei Karlov	Mevlüt Mert Altıntaş	Canik 55 TP9 handgun	Altıntaş was an off duty police officer and used his service weapon in the attack.
2018	Rio de Janeiro, Rio de Janeiro, Brazil	Marielle Franco	Ronald Paulo Alves Pereira and Adriano Magalhães da Nóbrega	Heckler & Koch MP5	
2018	Vitória, Espírito Santo, Brazil	Gerson Camata	Marcos Vinícius Moreira Andrade	Firearm	
2019	Gurabo, Puerto Rico	Jose Garcia Cosme	Unknown	Firearm	
2019	Araribóia Indigenous Territory, Maranhão, Brazil	Paulo Paulino Guajajara	Illegal loggers	Firearm	
2022	Nara, Nara Prefecture, Japan	Shinzo Abe	Tetsuya Yamagami	Improvised firearm	
2023	Quito, Pichincha, Ecuador	Fernando Villavicencio	Colombian hitmen	9mm pistol	
2023	Simões Filho, Bahia, Brazil	Mãe Bernadete	Unknown	Firearm	
2023	Amazon Rainforest, Peru	Quinto Inuma Alvarado	Belustiano Saboya Pisco and Genix Saboya Saboya	Unknown	His assassination was ordered by Segundo Villalobos Guevara.
2024	New York City, New York, United States	Brian Thompson	Luigi Mangione	3D printed pistol with 3D printed suppressor and loaded Glock 19 magazine	
2025	Brooklyn Park, Minnesota, United States	Melissa Hortman	Vance Boelter	Beretta 92	The victim's husband was also killed. Another senator was shot non-fatally.
2025	Orem, Utah, United States	Charlie Kirk	Tyler Robinson (suspect)	.30-06 Mauser M98 bolt action rifle (black, with scope)	
