= Fábrica de Armas Modernas =

Brazilian firearms manufacturer

Fábrica de Armas Modernas Ltda.
- Type: Sociedade Anônima
- Traded as: FAM
- Industry: Defense
- Founded: 1960; 66 years ago
- Founder: Miguel Raspa; Biagino Chieffi
- Defunct: 1978; 48 years ago
- Headquarters: Jacareí, Brazil
- Products: Firearms, weapons

Fábrica de Armas Modernas (or simply FAM), was a Brazilian firearms manufacturer that operated in the 60s and 70s.

== History ==
In the 60's, the designer and designer Miguel Raspa developed several projects of firearms and in partnership with Biagino Chieffi, opened a factory of light weapons based in the city of Jacareí, starting its production at the same time.

As it belonged to the owner of the fireworks manufacturer of the same name, the weapons manufactured by FAM were sold under the brand name Caramuru. The factory developed several weapons such as the R1, R6 and R7 revolvers (based on the Smith & Wesson Ladysmith), hunting rifles, cartridge cases, shotguns and some series of rifles in caliber .22 LR. Some of its single-choke rifles were even manufactured by the São Paulo company Lerap, under order from FAM itself.

Today Caramuru revolvers are considered a collector's item due to their rarity, it was considered a simple and economical weapon for transportation or simple personal defense, they also had a very low price if compared to traditional brands of weapons at the time such as Taurus, Rossi and INA. The company also developed a version of the R3 revolver in .38 Special caliber and a prototype of a machine gun based on the Israeli UZI.

It ended up closing its doors in 1978, its structure was resold and used to manufacture auto parts, one of its founders, Miguel Raspa became a shareholder in the also Urko Armas manufacturer, based in São Paulo.

== Products ==
=== Revolvers ===
- Modelo R1 (.22LR caliber)
- Modelo R3 (.38 SPL caliber)
- Modelo R6 (32 S&W; Long caliber)
- Modelo R7 (.22LR caliber)

=== Rifles ===
- Modelo K1 (.22LR caliber)
- Modelo CLK (.22LR caliber)
- Modelo K5 (.22LR caliber)

=== Shotguns ===
- Modelo 62 (various calibers) (manufactured under-license by Lerap)
