= Slocum revolver =

1864 American revolver design

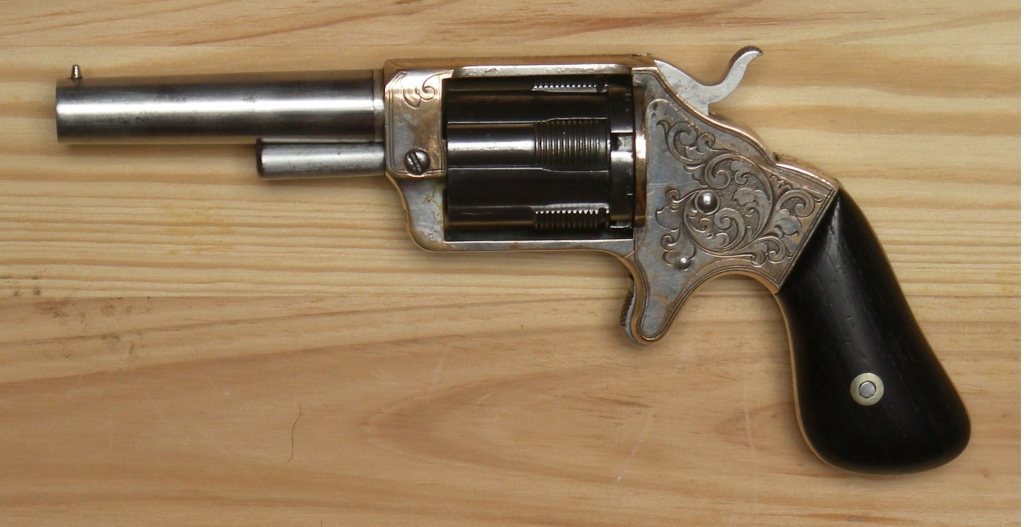
Slocum revolver left side

The Slocum Revolver in cal. 32 rimfire, was an attempt to circumvent the Rollin White patent. This 5-shot pocket revolver was made in 1864 by the Brooklyn Arms Co, based in Brooklyn, New York. Total quantity is estimated to have been more than 10,000 units.

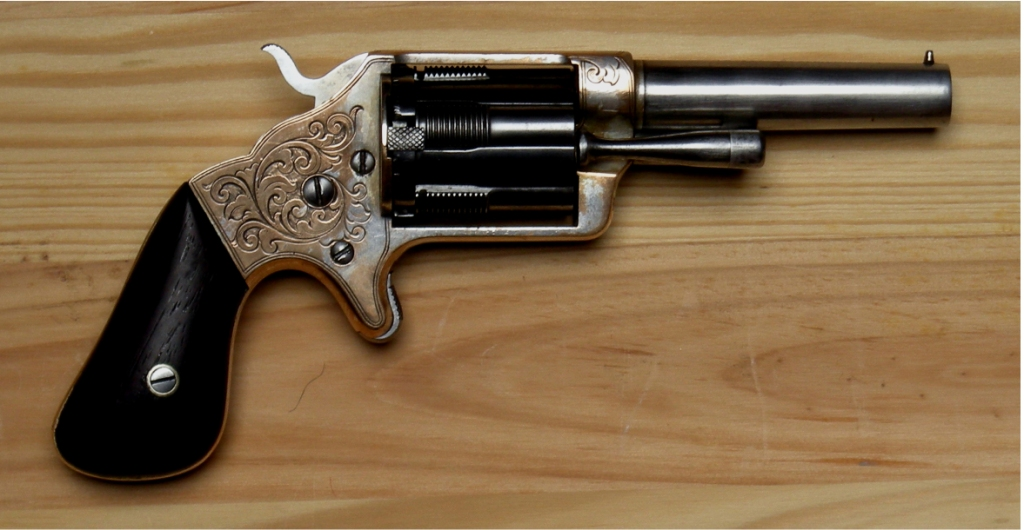
Slocum revolver right side

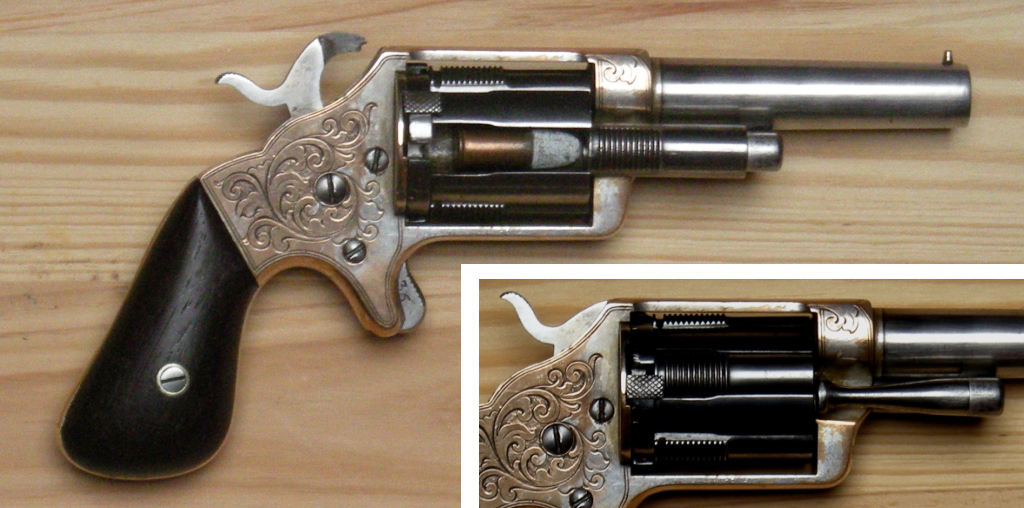
Slocum revolver, loading cartridge .38 short. Detail: Chamber locked

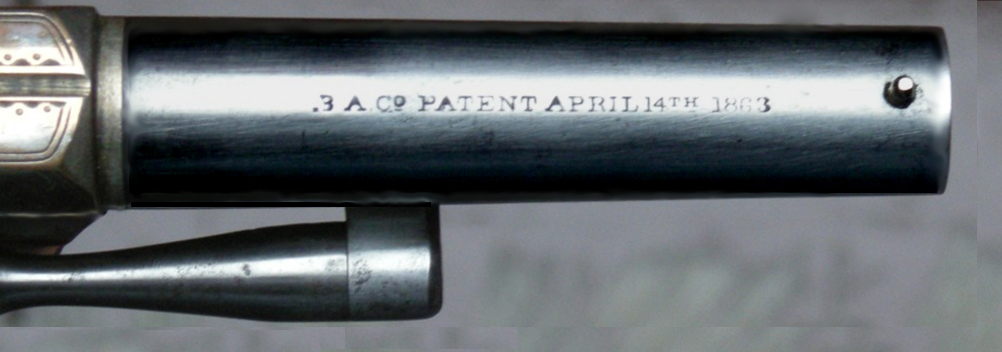
Barrel address

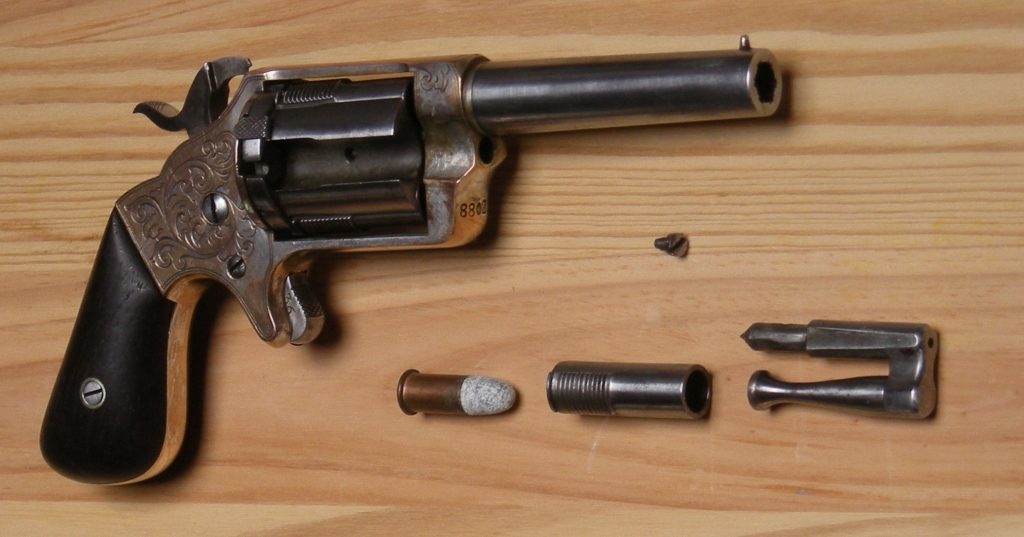
Slocum revolver partially dismounted

== History ==
The Slocum, a unique design, was patented on January 27. 1863 (Patent No. 37 551). Later, on April 14, 1863, a patent covering a slight modification of the cartridge ejector system (Patent No. 38 204), was granted to Frank P. Slocum. This circumvented the Rollin White “bored through cylinder” patent which belonged to Smith & Wesson.

Like the Smith & Wesson Model 1 1/2 and the Smith & Wesson Model No. 2 Army-revolvers, many caliber .32 rimfire Slocum revolvers were used as a Backup-weapon for self-defence by soldiers and officers during the American Civil War.

== Technical details ==
The Slocum single-action revolvers, chambered for calibre .32 rimfire long and short cartridges, were made with engraved brass frames originally silver plated, blued 3 inch round or octagonal barrels and 2-piece rose-wood grips. The cylinder of the revolver was designed with five individual chambers in the form of sliding tubes (length of the chambers 1.24 inch) within the cutouts of the cylinder. To remove spent cartridge cases and reload, the chambers slide forward one at a time over an ejector-rod at the front of the cylinder, fixed on the right side parallel to the barrel.
