= Antique firearms =

Firearms older than 20th century

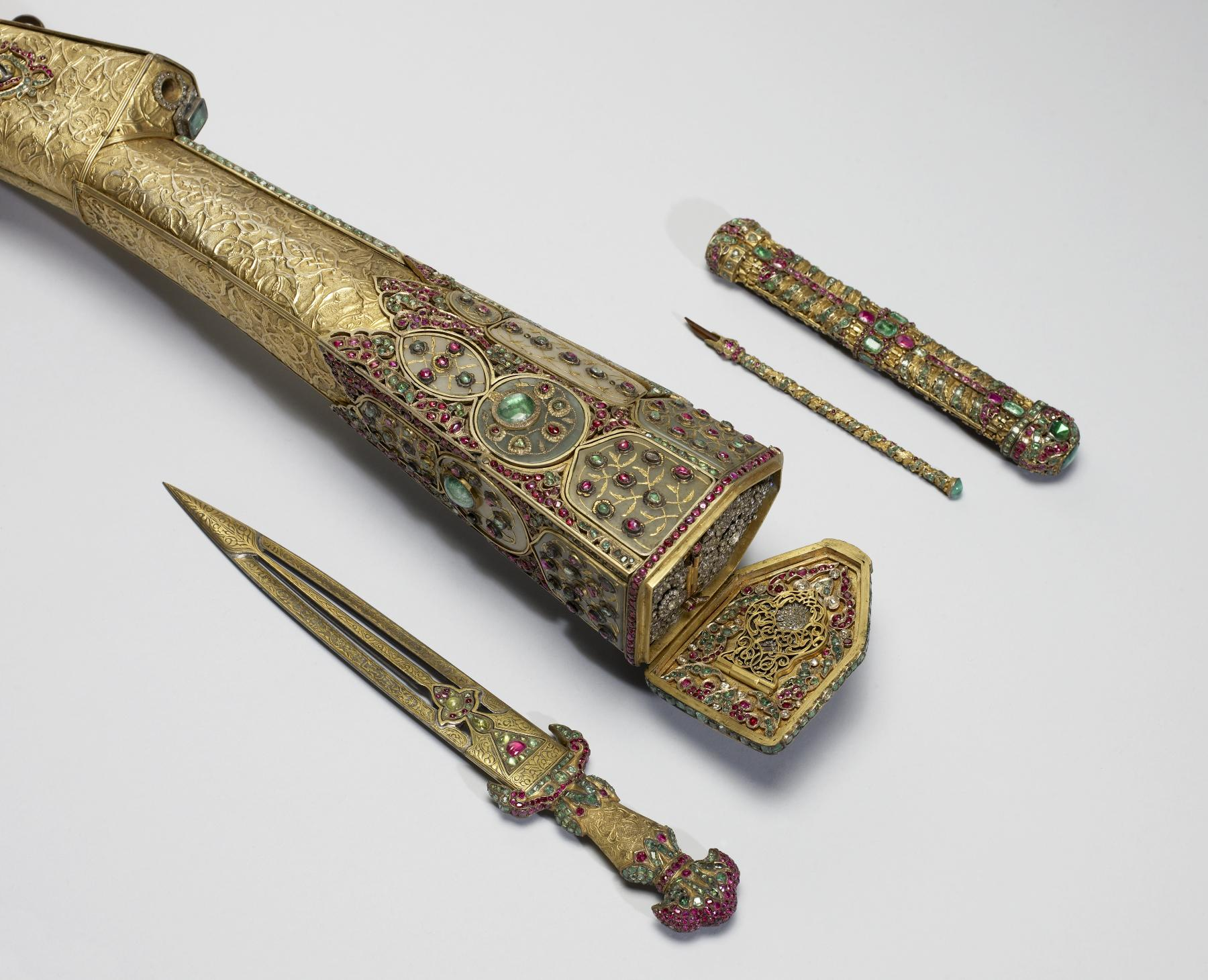
Referencing the elite pastimes of hunting and writing, this Turkish ceremonial jeweled rifle set includes a dagger, pen case, penholder with pen, penknife, cleaner, and a spoon-all conveniently housed within the rifle butt, Walters Art Museum

An antique firearm is a term used to describe a firearm that was designed and manufactured prior to the beginning of the 20th century. Although the exact definition of what constitutes an "antique firearm" varies between countries, the advent of smokeless powder or the start of the Boer War are often used as cut-off dates. Antique firearms are usually collected because of their historical interest and/or their monetary value.

== Categories ==
Antique firearms can be divided into two basic types: muzzle-loading and cartridge firing.

Muzzleloading antique firearms are not generally owned with the intent of firing them (although original muzzleloaders can be safely fired, after having them thoroughly inspected), but instead are usually owned as display pieces or for their historic value.

Cartridge-firing antique firearms are more commonly encountered as shooting pieces, but most antiques made from the 1860s through the 1880s were made with relatively mild steel and were designed to use black powder. They were limited to low bullet velocities and had heavily arcing "rainbow" bullet trajectories. However, advances in steel metallurgy and the advent of mass-produced smokeless powder in the early 1890s gave cartridge rifles of this new era much higher velocities and much flatter trajectories than their predecessors. These advances, typified by cartridges such as 8×50mmR Lebel, 7×57mm Mauser, .303 British, and 7.62×54mmR made many smokeless powder rifles manufactured in the 1890s capable of accurate shooting at long distances.

Many antique smokeless powder cartridge firearms from the 1880s and 1890s can still compete satisfactorily in target shooting events alongside their modern counterparts.

== Collectibility ==
Antique cartridge firearms are highly sought by collectors and shooters. This trend began in the 1950s, as before World War II antique firearm collecting was not very popular.

Collecting grades differ between modern firearms and antiques due to their age. For example, a modern firearm retaining 90% of its finish may be considered "Very Good" condition, yet an antique firearm can be classed the same as having 80% of its finish.

=== Prices ===
Given their scarcity, the prices of antique firearms have steadily risen. Some highly desired brands such as Colt and Winchester Repeating Arms Company have tripled or quadrupled in value in recent years. Current prices are best monitored by comparing prices at gun shows, auctions, websites, and by checking references such as "The Blue Book of Used Gun Values." Collectors also find gun auction catalogs, along with their accompanying "prices realized" sheets, particularly useful. Some auction houses, such as James D.Julia, publish photos, descriptions, and realized prices on their websites. Having provenance can greatly improve prices. The three main criteria for value are: rarity, condition, and provenance.

== Legality ==
Gun control laws vary widely from country to country. Several nations such as Australia, Canada, the Netherlands, Norway, the United Kingdom, and the United States make special exceptions in their gun laws for antique firearms. The "threshold" or "cut-off" years defining "antique" vary considerably. The threshold is pre-1898 in Canada, pre-1899 in the United States, and pre-1901 in Australia. Some countries like England exempt certain antiques but they do not set a specific threshold year. In the United States the ATF has the Gun Control Act definition as: For the purposes of the Gun Control Act of 1968, the term "Antique Firearms" means any firearm manufactured in or before 1898 (including any matchlock, flintlock, percussion cap or similar type of ignition system or replica thereof, whether actually manufactured before or after the year 1898)

=== Australia ===
Single-shot or double-barrel muzzleloading firearms manufactured before January 1, 1901, are considered antique firearms in all States of Australia, and can be legally purchased, used and owned. Victoria and Queensland do not require people to have a licence for them.

Cartridge-loading firearms manufactured prior to January 1, 1901, may or may not be considered "antique", depending on the commercial availability of ammunition. For example, a Martini–Enfield rifle manufactured in 1896 would not be considered antique in any state of Australia, as it is chambered in .303 British, a calibre which is still commercially manufactured and readily available to most of Australia's 2.0 million gun owners.

Conversely, firearms manufactured after January 1, 1901, are not considered antiques, even if they are replicas of antique firearms (such as modern reproductions of black-powder guns), or if ammunition is no longer commercially available (such as the Arisaka Type 38 Rifle)

Antique cap & ball revolvers require licensing in all states, except Queensland where an individual may possess such a firearm without a license, so long as it is registered with the police.

=== Argentina ===
All muzzleloading black-powder firearms are free to sale and possess, new or old. All kinds of mobile (i.e. revolver) and static (i.e. cannons) guns and ammo made up to 1870 inclusive are free to sale, buy and collect.

=== Belgium ===
As non-licensed weapons for the purposes of Article 3, § 2, 2, of the Arms Act are considered weapons of a historical, folkloric or decorative value:

1 °, That are loaded through the breach, the muzzle or from the front of the cylinder are charged only with black powder or cartridges with black powder and separate ignition loaded, whose model or the patent dates back to 1890 and manufactured before 1945

2 ° using only cartridges with ignition, loaded with black powder, of which the model or the patent dates from 1890 and were produced pre-1945;

3 ° using cartridges with smokeless powder and that are listed in Annex 1 of the decree of 29 December 2006.

4 ° produced before 1897 or for which ammunition is no longer in production.

=== Canada ===
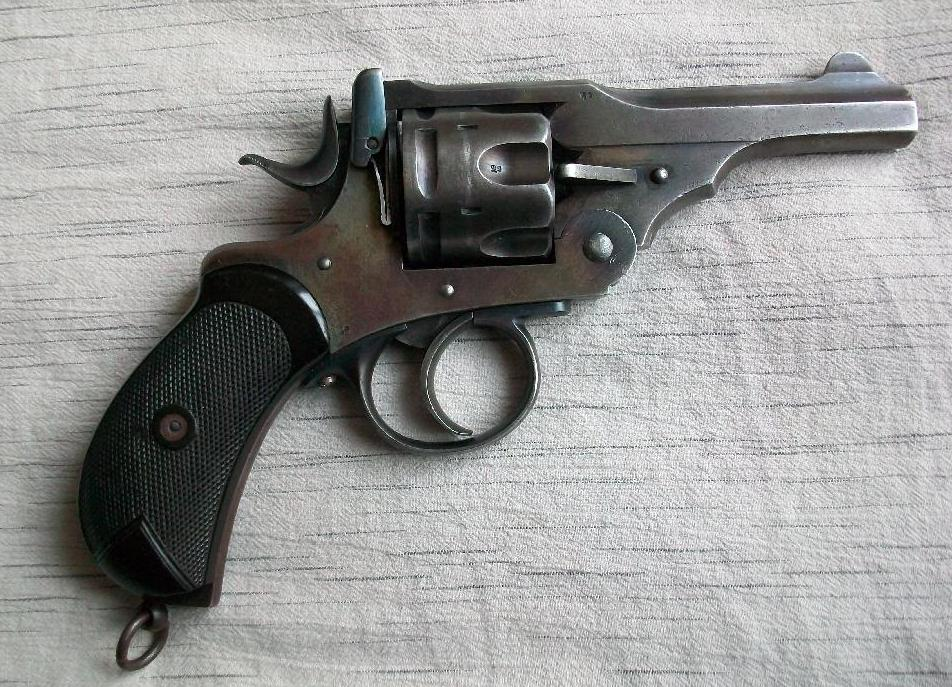
An Antique Webley Mk I .455 Revolver, circa 1887

In Canada antique firearms are defined under Section 84(1) of the Criminal Code and Regulations Prescribing Antique Firearms, SOR/98-464 as any firearm manufactured before 1898:

- not designed to fire rim-fire or centre-fire cartridges (e.g. flintlock, wheellock, matchlock, cap and ball),
- capable of only firing rim-fire cartridges other than .22 Short, .22 Long and .22 Long Rifle,
- rifles capable of firing centre-fire cartridges with a bore of greater than 8.3 mm, except for repeating rifles fed by any type of cartridge magazine,
- shotguns capable of firing centre-fire cartridges, except for 10, 12, 16, 20, 28 gauge and .410, and,
- handguns capable of firing centre-fire cartridges, other than a handgun designed or adapted to discharge .32 Short Colt, .32 Long Colt, .32 S&W, .32 S&W Long, .32-20 Winchester, .38 S&W, .38 Short Colt, .38 Long Colt, .38-40 Winchester, .44-40 Winchester, and .45 Colt.

For example, the Webley Mk I qualifies as an antique firearm in Canada because it was manufactured prior to 1898 and was designed to use Webley .455 (Mk I) calibre ammunition. These revolvers were used by both the police and the military in the late 19th and early 20th centuries, and are now sought-after examples of antique Canadiana.

The threshold for antique status being one year earlier (1898) than in the United States (1899) is a minor source of confusion for antique gun collectors and dealers in North America.

=== Chile ===
In Chile, the figure of 'antique firearm' doesn't exist, and all firearms regardless of age must be properly registered. This has led to a great number of historic weapons being turned in for destruction by their former owners who do not wish to go through the lengthy certification and registration process.

=== Czech Republic ===
According to the Czech Firearms Act, the following are considered as historical weapons:

(a) A firearm that was manufactured before 31 December 1890, provided that all main parts of the firearm were manufactured before 31 December 1890,

(b) a single-shot or double-shot firearm that was constructed before 31 December 1890 and is based on the principles of the breech-loading, wheel-loading, flintlock or percussion-lock systems; or

(c) a needle gun which was constructed before 31 December 1880.

=== Finland ===
In Finland, black-powder weapons manufactured before 1890 are exempt from licensing requirements, unless they are actually used for shooting. The Ministry of the Interior has authority to issue secondary legislation to release other kinds of historically valuable antique firearms from licensing requirements.

=== The Netherlands ===
Exempt are the following weapons (leaving out items that are not relevant in this context):

b. All firearms produced before January 1, 1870

c. Rifles, shotguns, revolvers, pistols and combination-firearms designed and destined to be loaded with:

1) Loose balls and black powder, or

2) Cartridges, not being rimfire cartridges in caliber .22 or centrefire cartridges

d. Rifles, shotguns and pistols (not being revolvers) designed and destined to be loaded with cartridges of which the propellant consists of black powder or only priming compound, except rimfire cartridges in caliber .22 with a cartridge length or more than 18mm

e. Artillery pieces designed and destined to be loaded with loose projectiles and black powder, loose or in bagcharges

The exemption mentioned in points c, d and e only applies to weapons produced before January 1, 1945.

Notes:

Point b, c.1), c.2), d and e are separate groups, the criteria are not cumulative

Please note that point c.2) does NOT take into consideration what powder is used. Only the obsolete ignition system of the cartridge is the deciding factor.

Point d. means that, in black-powder caliber .22 rf, only calibers .22 CB, .22 BB and .22 short are allowed. .22 long, lr and WRF are not.

Specific types of weapons are mentioned in the law. That means that the exemption does not apply to other types of weapons. A pinfire rifle may be free but a pinfire trapgun is not, a muzzleloading cannon from the American civil war is free but a Gatling model 1873 is not.

=== Norway ===
In 2008 a new Norwegian firearms law re-defined an "antique" as any black powder firearm produced before 1890, or one that is chambered in a caliber the Crown (Norwegian Department of Justice) considers obsolete.

=== Poland ===
Firearms manufactured before 1885 that are separately loaded (not using cartridges or using cartridges with separate cap ignition) and replicas of such weapons, do not require a license.

=== Spain ===
Firearms manufactured before 1870 are considered exempt antiques under Article 107 of the Regulations on Arms.

=== Sweden ===
Firearms manufactured before 1890 and that do not support "gas tight" cartridges (gastät enhetspatron) are considered antique and do not require a license, under Sweden's 1996 gun law (1996:67).

=== Switzerland ===
Firearms manufactured prior to 1870 are considered exempt antiques under Article 2, alinea 3 of the Federal Gunlaw (amendment 2008-12-12).

=== United Kingdom ===
In the United Kingdom, antique firearms are exempt from most controls, but the definition of "antique" in Section 58(2) of the Firearms Act 1968 is vague. Interpretation of the law is often left up to local police officials. However, guidance was issued by the Home Office in paragraph 2.7 of 'Firearms Law: Guidance to the Police' in 1989, suggesting that a range of vintage firearms might be considered for 'antique' status ('vintage' for those purposes means manufactured before 1939). Following advice from the Firearms Consultative Committee (FCC), the Government issued further guidance in a circular letter to chief officers on 19 November 1992, as follows:

The provisions of the Firearms Acts 1968 to 1997 do not apply to any antique firearm held as a curiosity or ornament. The word 'antique' is not defined in the Act, but it is suggested that the categories below should be used as a guide in deciding whether a particular firearm might be considered an 'antique' for these purposes.

Part I: Old weapons which should benefit from exemption as antiques under section 58 (2) of the Firearms Act 1968

a) All muzzle-loading firearms;

b) Breech-loading firearms capable of discharging a rim-fire cartridge other than 4mm, 5mm, .22" or .23" (or their metric equivalents), 6mm or 9mm rimfire;

c) Breech-loading firearms using ignition systems other than rimfire and centrefire (These include pin-fire and needle-fire ignition systems, as well as the more obscure lip fire, cup-primed, teat fire and base fire systems);

d) Breech-loading centre-fire arms originally chambered for one of the obsolete cartridges listed in Annex B and which retain their original chambering;

e) Vintage (pre 1939) rifles, shotguns and punt guns chambered for the following cartridges expressed in imperial measurements: 32 bore, 24 bore, 14 bore, 10 bore (5/8" and 2 7/8" only), 8 bore, 4 bore, 3 bore, 2 bore, 1 1/8 bore, 1 1/4 bore and 1 1/2 bore, and vintage punt guns and shotguns with bores of 10 or greater.

Note (i) – The exemption does not apply to ammunition, and the possession of live ammunition suitable for use with an otherwise antique firearm will normally indicate that the firearm is not possessed as a curio or ornament.

Note (ii) – The exemption does not apply to firearms of modern manufacture which otherwise conform to the description above. Fully working modern firing replicas of muzzle-loading and breech-loading firearms, for example those used to fire blanks by historical re-enactment societies but capable of firing live ammunition, must be held on certificate. For these purposes, 'modern manufacture' should be taken to mean manufacture after the outbreak of the Second World War in 1939.

Old weapons which should not benefit from the exemption as antiques under section 58(2) of the Firearms Act 1968

NB: This list is not exhaustive and there may be other types and calibres of firearms that should be considered 'modern' rather than 'antique'.

a) Shotguns and smooth-bored guns, including shot pistols, chambered for standard shotgun cartridges, .22 inch, .23 inch, 6mm and 9mm rim-fire cartridges;).

b) Rifles and handguns chambered for 4mm, 5mm, .22 inch, .23 inch, 6mm or 9mm rim-fire ammunition;

c) Revolvers, single-shot pistols and self-loading pistols which are chambered for, and will accept, popular centre-fire cartridges of the type .25, .32, .38, .380, .44, .450, .455 and .476 inch, or their metric equivalents including 6.35, 7.62, 7.63, 7.65, 8 and 9mm, unless otherwise specified;

d) Modern reproduction firearms or old firearms which have been modified to allow the use of shotgun cartridges or cartridges not listed in Annex B;

e) Extensively modified weapons (e.g. Sawn off shotguns);

f) Very signalling pistols chambered for 1- and 1 1/2-inch cartridges or 26.5/27mm cartridges;

g) Pump-action and self-loading centre fire rifles, except that examples originally chambered for one of the obsolete cartridges listed at Annex B and retaining that original chambering, may benefit from exemption as antiques under section 58(2) of the Firearms Act 1968 (as amended)

=== United States ===
Under the United States Gun Control Act of 1968, any cartridge firearm made in or before 1898 ("pre-1899") is classified as an "antique", and is generally outside of Federal jurisdiction, as administered and enforced by the Bureau of Alcohol, Tobacco, Firearms and Explosives (BATFE). The only exceptions to the Federal exemption are antique machineguns (such as the Maxim gun and Colt Model 1895 "Potato Digger") and shotguns firing shotgun shells that are classified as "short barreled" per the U.S. National Firearms Act, namely cartridge rifles with a barrel less than 16 inches long, or shotguns firing shotgun shells with a barrel less than 18 inches long, or either cartridge rifles or shotgun-shell-firing shotguns with an overall length of less than 26 inches.

Modern muzzleloading replicas of antique guns are not subject to Federal jurisdiction and are essentially classified the same as an antique firearm. Hence, a muzzleloading black-powder shotgun is not subject to the short-barreled National Firearms Act of 1934 restrictions. Purchases of such modern-day manufactured replicas may be done outside of the normal Federal Firearms License (FFL) restrictions that otherwise exist when purchasing modern (post-1898) firearms. Modern replicas of firearms that can fire fixed ammunition, however, are not classed the same as antiques, but must be shipped through FFL holders, although a true antique that was manufactured prior to 1899 firing the same cartridge as the replica would be legal for sale without the transfer being processed through an FFL. Furthermore, any rifle re-built on a receiver or frame that was manufactured prior to 1899 is considered antique, even if it has been re-barreled or even if every other part has been replaced.

The following is an excerpt from the portion of the Gun Control Act of 1968 (which modified Title 18, U.S. Code) that exempted pre-1899 firearms from the Federal Firearms License paperwork requirements administered by the ATF:

18 USC 921 (a)(16).

(A) any firearm (including any firearm with a matchlock, flintlock, percussion cap, or similar type of ignition system) manufactured in or before 1898; and (B) any replica of any firearm described in subparagraph (A) if such replica – (i) is not designed or redesigned for using rimfire or conventional centerfire fixed ammunition, or (ii) uses rimfire or conventional centerfire fixed ammunition which is no longer manufactured

in the United States and which is not readily available in the ordinary channels of commercial trade.

Within the United States, antique exemptions vary considerably from state to state.

==== Identifying pre-1899 antiques ====
The production of many cartridge firearms, such as the famous Winchester Model 1894 lever-action rifle took place both before and after the December 31, 1898, cut-off date that delineates exempt antique status under U.S. law. For example, a Winchester Model 1894 with serial number 147,685 had its frame (or "receiver") made in December 1898 and it is hence classified as an "antique", but records show that a Winchester Model 1894 with serial number 147,686 had its frame made in January, 1899 and it is hence classified as "modern" by the BATFE.

Since it is the date of manufacture of the receiver that is relevant to identifying a firearm as antique or modern, it is possible to have a weapon with date marks post-1898 but still be considered an antique firearm. For example, some Finnish M39 (Ukko-Pekka) Mosin–Nagant rifles with hexagonal profile receivers are considered antique because some were built on receivers dated pre-1899, even though the rifle itself was adopted in 1939. Many of these were assembled using a mix of old round and "hex" receivers from then on, until as late as the 1970s. To be identified as pre-1899, however, Mosin–Nagants that have been re-barreled must be disassembled to see the date stamps on their tangs. A similar situation exists for 7.65mm Mauser Turkish Model 1893 bolt rifles, most of which were re-arsenalized at the Ankara arsenal in the 1940s, and rechambered to 8×57mm Mauser. Despite this re-arsenalization and rechambering, they are still considered antiques under US law as all rifles of that model were manufactured between 1893 and 1896. Likewise, all firearms produced by Ludwig Loewe & Co. A.G., which are marked "Ludwig Loewe" or "Loewe, Berlin", are antiques. This is because Ludwig Loewe was merged into Deutsche Waffen und Munitionsfabriken in 1897, and the Loewe name was no longer used after the merger.

In United States vs. Kirvan (1996), which involved an antique replica weapon, a U.S. Court of Appeals held that an antique gun was still a "firearm" for purposes of a sentencing enhancement, saying:

Like a rose, which “[b]y any other name would smell as sweet,” William Shakespeare, Romeo and Juliet act II, sc. 2, line 44 (W.J. Craig ed., Oxford Univ. Press 1928), so Kirvan's firearm, be it new or antique, could kill as well.

== See also ==
- List of firearms before the 20th century
- History of the firearm
- Lebel
- Robert Adams of London

== Sources ==
- Flayderman, Norm (2007). Flayderman's Guide to Antique American Firearms and Their Values (9 ed.). Iola, Wisconsin: F+W Media, Inc. ISBN 978-0-89689-455-6.
