= Son of Paleface =

1952 film by Frank Tashlin

- Theatrical release poster
- Directed by: Frank Tashlin
- Written by: Frank Tashlin; Joseph Quillan; Robert L. Welch
- Based on: The Paleface
- Starring: Bob Hope; Jane Russell; Roy Rogers
- Cinematography: Harry J. Wild
- Edited by: Eda Warren
- Music by: Lyn Murray
- Color process: Technicolor
- Production company: Hope Enterprises
- Distributed by: Paramount Pictures
- Release date: July 14, 1952 (US)
- Running time: 95 minutes
- Country: United States
- Language: English
- Box office: $3.4 million (US)

Son of Paleface is a 1952 American comedy Western film directed by Frank Tashlin and starring Bob Hope, Jane Russell, and Roy Rogers. The film is a sequel to The Paleface (1948). Written by Tashlin, Joseph Quillan, and Robert L. Welch, the film is about a man who returns home to claim his father's gold, which is nowhere to be found. Son of Paleface was released in the United States by Paramount Pictures on July 14, 1952.

== Plot ==
Peter "Junior" Potter has graduated from Harvard and heads west to the western town of Sawbuck Pass to claim his father's fortune. Driving into town in a jalopy, wearing a comical striped suit jacket, he splashes mud all over a crowd of townspeople. He discovers to his horror that practically everyone in town claims to be owed money by his father, and that his father's treasure chest is empty.

Strutting around town in his dramatic red and white striped Harvard blazer, Junior stalls the townfolk for as long as he can, continually making allusions to his wealth. An old-timer, Eb, convinces him the gold does exist, but it is hidden.

In the saloon, he makes the acquaintance of a singing cowboy named Roy and a sexy saloon performer with the masculine name of Mike, who has to fend off Junior's persistent advances. In the bar, Mike and Roy sing "Buttons and Bows" while Potter raps about Harvard.

Junior tries to romance Mike and she drugs him. While he is asleep, she assumes her alter ego of "the Torch" and leads her gang in a night time raid. Junior provides a perfect alibi. The townsfolk have sabotaged Junior's car, but he improvises and adds cart wheels to escape the town. He drives across the desert with two vultures hitching a ride. He goes to the ghost town of Sterling City. He finds Eb dead in a barber's chair. Roy arrives and accuses him of murder. Junior disguises himself as Roy to try to escape on Trigger. Roy is a government agent with a Smith & Wesson Model 320 Revolving Rifle hidden in his guitar case, bent on capturing her.

The town is attacked by Indians. Junior is at first too scared to fight and Roy fights alone. Paleface's ghost appears and convinces him that Hell is fine. He grabs a gun and starts firing. Firing from the barber's chair, it starts to spin with shots going in random directions. One shot hits a moose head, where his father's gold begins to pour out. Mike arrives and helps in the fight. Mike and Junior escape on his improvised car.

Roy fights the gang in their hideout in an abandoned mine. With a bit of accidental help from Junior, they win the fight.

Junior is waiting for Mike when she comes out of prison (with four Junior Juniors). They say goodbye to Roy as Trigger has a triumphant rear-up silhouetted against the sunset.

== Cast ==
- Bob Hope as Peter "Junior" Potter Jr./Peter Potter
- Jane Russell as Mike "the Torch" Delroy
- Roy Rogers as Roy Barton
- Trigger (specifically, "Trigger Jr.") as Trigger, Roy Barton's horse
- Bill Williams as Kirk
- Lloyd Corrigan as Doc Lovejoy
- Paul E. Burns as Ebenezer ("Eb") Hawkins
- Douglass Dumbrille as Sheriff McIntyre
- Harry von Zell as Mr. Stoner, the banker
- Iron Eyes Cody as Chief Yellow Cloud
- William 'Wee Willie' Davis as Blacksmith
- Charles Cooley as Charley
- Sylvia Lewis as Saloon Dancer
- Jean Willes as Penelope
- Cecil B. DeMille cameo as photographer (uncredited)
- Flo Stanton as Flo (uncredited)
- Bing Crosby film clip of (uncredited)
- Chester Conklin as Chester (uncredited)

== Production ==
The first choice Bob Hope wanted for the female lead was Maureen O'Hara, but she turned the film down.

== Reception ==
Son of Paleface was the third most popular film at the British box office in 1952.
