= Smith & Wesson Model 2 =

Smith & Wesson Model 2 (Single Action)
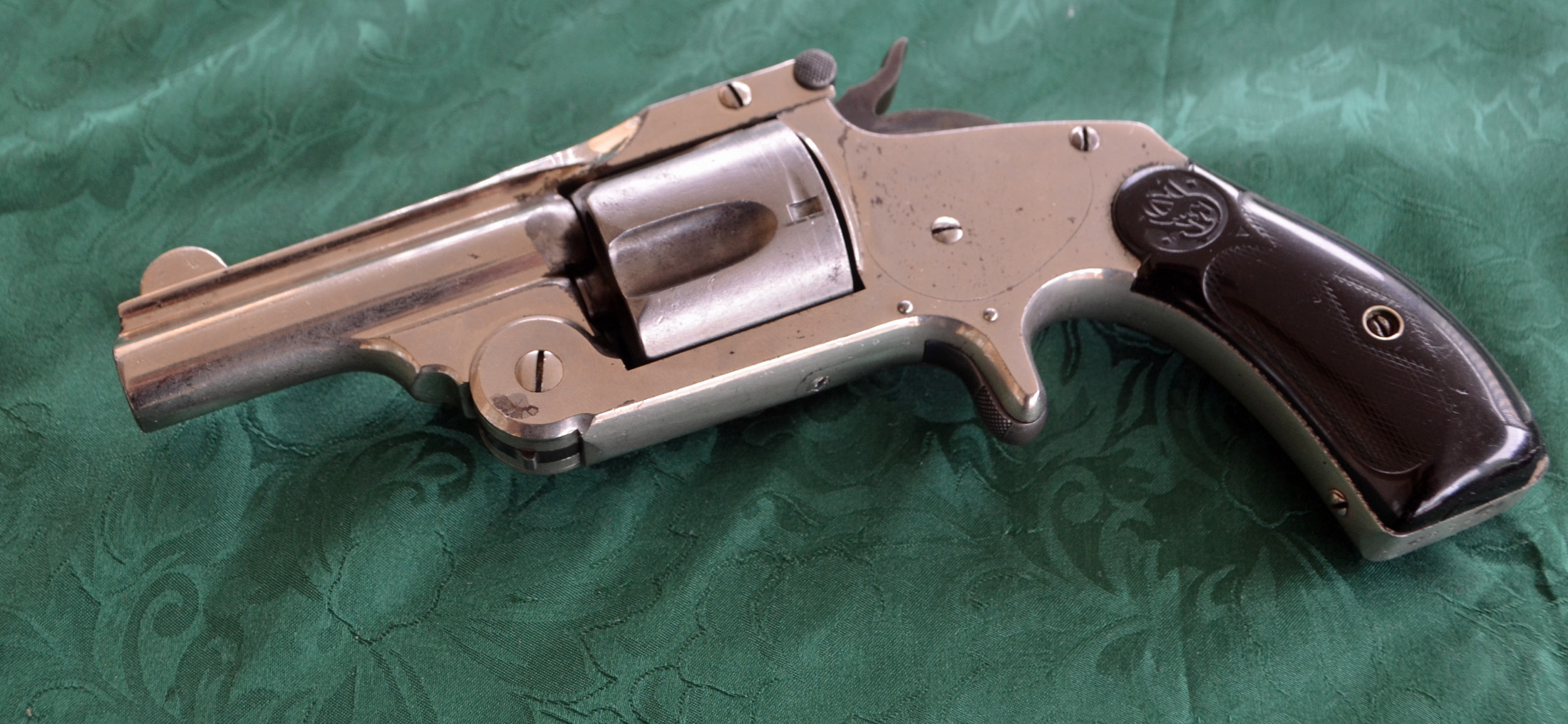
- Smith & Wesson .38 Single-Action, Second Model
- Type: Revolver
- Place of origin: United States

Service history
- Used by: United States

Production history
- Manufacturer: Smith & Wesson
- Produced: 1876–1911
- No. built: approx. 25,548 (1st model), 108,255 (2nd model), 97,000 (3rd model)

Specifications
- Caliber: .38 S&W Blackpowder
- Action: Single action
- Feed system: 5-round cylinder
- Sights: Fixed

The Smith & Wesson Model 2, also referred to as the Smith & Wesson .38 Single Action, was a .38 caliber revolver produced in both single and double action by Smith & Wesson. The manufacturer's first of that caliber, its 5-shot cylinder was chambered in .38 S&W. The single-action was produced in three varieties from 1876 through 1911, with total production exceeding 223,000 units; the double-action in three variants from 1880 to 1913, with total sales somewhat under one-million guns.

The Model 2 fired a black powder cartridge. It was a "top-break" weapon, with the barrel release catch located on the top of the frame, just in front of the hammer. It was a larger caliber version of the third model of the Smith & Wesson Model 1 1/2.

== Single Action ==
In 1876, Smith & Wesson Model 2 debuted in a single-action format, meaning the hammer had to be cocked manually to set the trigger in order to fire the revolver. These revolvers fired black powder cartridges, and were available in nickel or blued finishes.

=== 1st Model ===
The first model of the .38 Single Action can be identified by its smooth barrel (lacking fluting), and the long extractor shroud similar to the Smith & Wesson Model 3 Russian pistol, which lent it the nickname "Baby Russian". It had a spur trigger and lacked a trigger guard. Models were available in blued or nickel-plated finishes, and the majority were produced with 3 1/2-inch or 4-inch barrels, although barrels as long as 7 inches were sold.

Serial numbers range from 1 through to 25,548 between 1876 and 1877. This pistol was used by the Baltimore Police Department from 1876 to 1917 and such revolvers are marked "City of Balto".

=== 2nd Model ===
The second model of the 38 Single Action used a shorter and more efficient ejection and extraction system and lacked the shroud of the 1st model. It was produced in blued steel and nickel-plated versions, with most models having a 3 1/2-inch or 4 1/2-inch barrel. Rare versions had barrels of 6, 8 and 10 inches in length.

These revolvers had a spur trigger, lacked a trigger guard and were serial numbered consecutively from 1 through 108,255. sn "007".

=== 3rd Model ===
The third model of the 38 Single Action was made from 1891 to 1911 and is often known as the 1891 Model, Model 01 or the Model of 91 as the latter is stamped on the top of the barrel. This version used a standard trigger and a trigger guard, but 2000 of these revolvers were made for the Mexican government with the spur trigger and no guard and are referred to as the "Mexican Model".

== Double Action ==
Smith & Wesson Model 2 (Double Action)
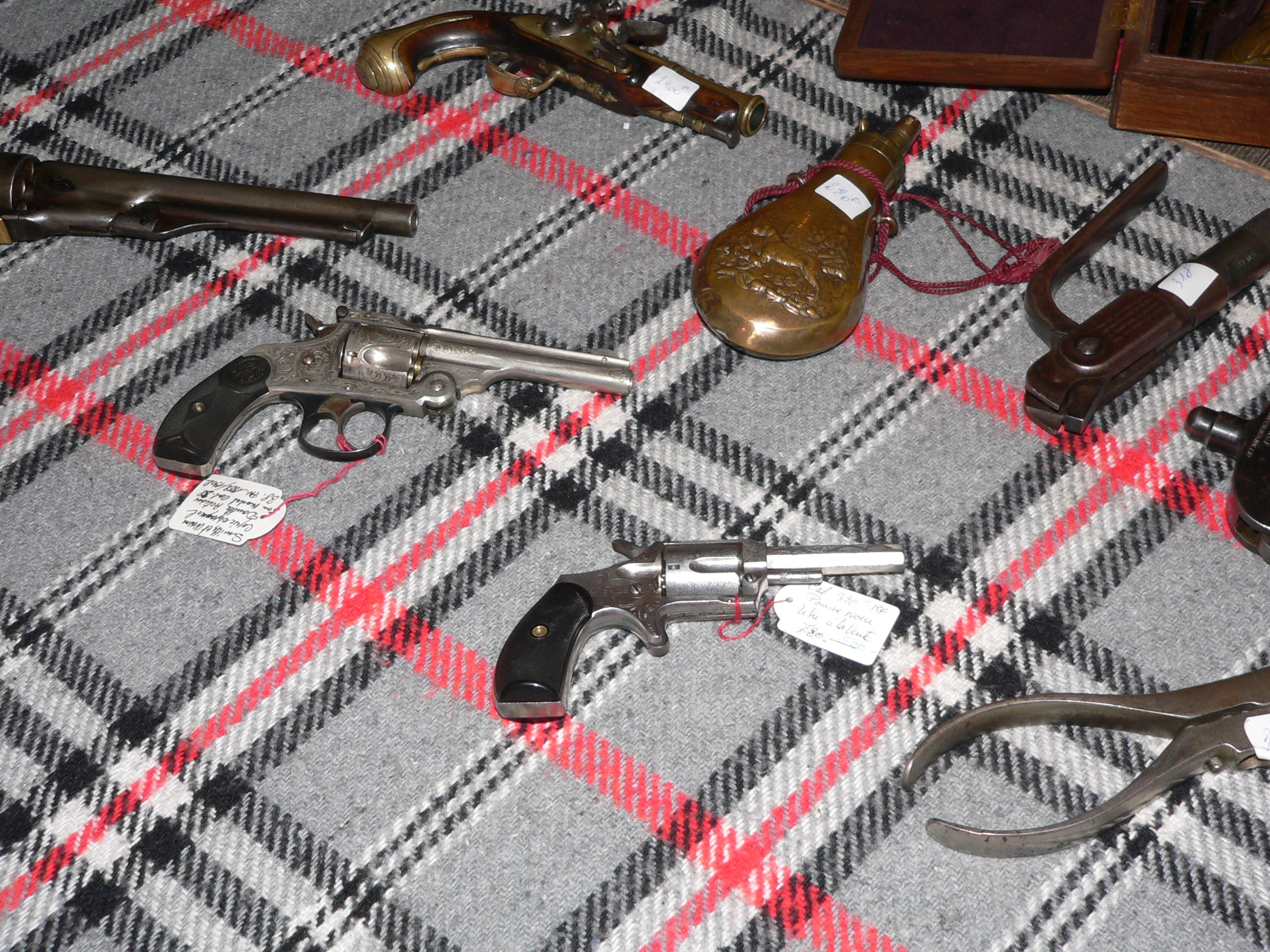
- The middle revolver to the left is a Model 2 (Double Action 38) revolver.
- Type: Revolver
- Place of origin: United States

Production history
- Manufacturer: Smith & Wesson
- Produced: 1880–1913
- No. built: approx. 328,645 (32 S&W), 554,000 (38 S&W) 59,400 (Perfected Model)

Specifications
- Caliber: .32 S&W, .38 S&W Blackpowder
- Action: Double Action
- Feed system: 5-round cylinder
- Sights: Fixed

In 1880, Smith & Wesson offered the Model 2 in a double-action format, whereby a single squeeze of the trigger both cocked the hammer and fired the weapon. These black powder revolvers are easily recognizable by their fully enclosed trigger guard. The first such revolvers made by Smith & Wesson. The double-action Model 2 was available in nickel or blued finishes and a smaller version was offered in .32 Smith & Wesson.

=== Double Action 32 ===
The Model 2 in .32 S&W was made in 5 iterations. The initial version was a batch of 30 revolvers that were the first of such made by Smith & Wesson with a trigger guard in 1880. These models were deemed to be sub-par and did not leave the factory until 1888. The second version was improved and a total of 22,142 of these were manufactured until 1882. The third variant made from 1882 until 1885 included 22,232 revolvers. The fourth version was made from 1885 until 1909 and included 239,600 models. The final fifth variant included 44,641 pieces and was discontinued in 1919.

=== Double Action .38 ===
The Model 2 in .38 S&W was produced in five iterations. The initial run in 1880 consisted of 4,000 revolvers (Serial Numbers 1 through approximately 4,000). The second version featured mechanical improvements, with 115,000 units manufactured from 1880 until 1884 (Serial Numbers 4,001 through 119,000). The third variant, produced from 1884 until 1895, included 203,700 revolvers (Serial Numbers 119,001 through 322,700). The fourth version was made from 1895 until 1909 and included 216,300 models (Serial Numbers 322,701 through 539,000). The fifth variant included approximately 15,000 pieces and was discontinued in 1911 (Serial Numbers 539,001 through 554,077). The third and fourth versions saw use as police revolvers for Cleveland, Ohio, Boston, and Baltimore, as well as by security guards for the American Express Company.

The final evolution of these top-break double-action .38s was the Perfected Model. This version utilized a top-break frame with a sideplate thumb latch and was produced from 1909 until 1920 for a total of 59,400 revolvers. This model was notably used by Floyd Allen in a courthouse escape attempt in 1912.

=== Smith & Wesson Safety Hammerless ===
The Smith & Wesson Safety Hammerless is a double-action revolver that was produced from 1887 to 1940 by Smith & Wesson. Based on the Model 2 double-action design, the revolver incorporated an internal hammer and an external grip safety on its back-strap. It was chambered in .32 S&W and .38 S&W calibers. These revolvers were discontinued prior to World War II, as they had been eclipsed by the superior technology of the hand-ejector models.
