= Lerap =

Brazilian firearms manufacturer

Fundição e Indústria de Armas Lerap Ltda.
- Type: Sociedade Anônima
- Industry: Arms industry
- Founded: 1939; 87 years ago
- Defunct: 1964; 62 years ago
- Headquarters: São Paulo, Brazil
- Products: Firearms, weapons

Fundição e Indústria de Armas Lerap Ltda, commonly shortened to Lerap, was a São Paulo firearms manufacturer headquartered in the Brás neighborhood. Its name comes from the junction of the surnames of the two founders: Lemck and Rapp.

== History ==
The company was founded aiming to manufacture steel and iron parts, pipes, taps, tubes, valves, and household items, and later began to manufacture weapons. Its weapons were manufactured and based on the typical Spanish and Belgian garruches, and its main feature was a locking system identical to that of Leclerc rifles, similar to the Snake Key. Their weapons were mostly of simple manufacture and low cost, even making some replicas and their own versions of overlapping double-barrel shotguns and Derringer-type pocket pistols.

In 1942, it requested a permit from the Ministry of War to export some of its single-barreled rifles to Ecuador. In the 1960s, it also manufactured single-barreled rifles under the Caramuru brand, under order from Fábrica de Armas Modernas, and continued manufacturing its own weapons until it closed its activities around 1964.

== Products ==
A not extensive list of Lerap's products:

=== Shotguns ===
- Modelo 62 (various calibers) (manufactured under-license)
