= Urko Armas =

Brazilian firearms manufacturer

Urko Indústria e Comécio de Armas Ltda
- Type: Private
- Industry: Arms Industry
- Founded: 1966; 60 years ago
- Defunct: 2005; 21 years ago
- Headquarters: São Paulo, Brazil
- Key people: Ignacio Maria Lascurain Arizaga; Ana Maria Lascurain Fridori
- Products: Airguns, Firearms

Urko Armas was a manufacturer of firearms and air gun that had its headquarters in the city of São Paulo, Brazil.

== History ==
It is not known exactly when it started producing weapons or if it had any relationship with the homonymous Spanish arms manufacturer Urko. In the records available on the Internet by the Brazilian Federal Revenue Service, its opening is in the year 1966.

Urko was very popular in the 1970s and 1980s for its low-cost guns, and well known for its 4.5mm caliber air rifles, .22 LR bolt-action rifles and for its .38 Special carbine which was used by the DOPS (Departamento de Ordem Politica e Social) of the Civil Police of the State of São Paulo in the 1970s and 1980s. Their weapons were widely used by beginner shooters, civilians, private surveillance companies and cash transportation.

The guerrilla Carlos Lamarca, at the time a captain in the Brazilian Army, appeared in several photos in 1968 carrying an Urko .22LR Semi-automatic carbine while giving shooting instruction to Bradesco bankers; at the time, he was providing training for bankers to defend themselves in case of robberies of the branches where they worked.

There is little information about this manufacturer, but it is known that it gained a cult following with many shooters for a long time due to its low cost firearms with non-standardized finishing, often leaving a lot to be desired in quality.

It is believed that it was closed in the 2005, due to the increasing restrictions on firearms in Brazil. A few years later, its former owner founded Fiora Esportes, a air gun manufacturer also based in São Paulo.

== Products ==
=== Air guns ===
- Tiger Pistol (in 4.5mm)
- Modelo I, II and III carbines (in 4.5mm and 5.5mm)

=== Rifles ===
- Semi-automatic rifle (in .22LR)
  - a Carbine version was also offered, Some included a pistol grip and folding stock before being banned due to their resemblance to a submachine gun
- Bolt action rifle (in .22LR and .38SPL)
