= Werder pistol model 1869 =

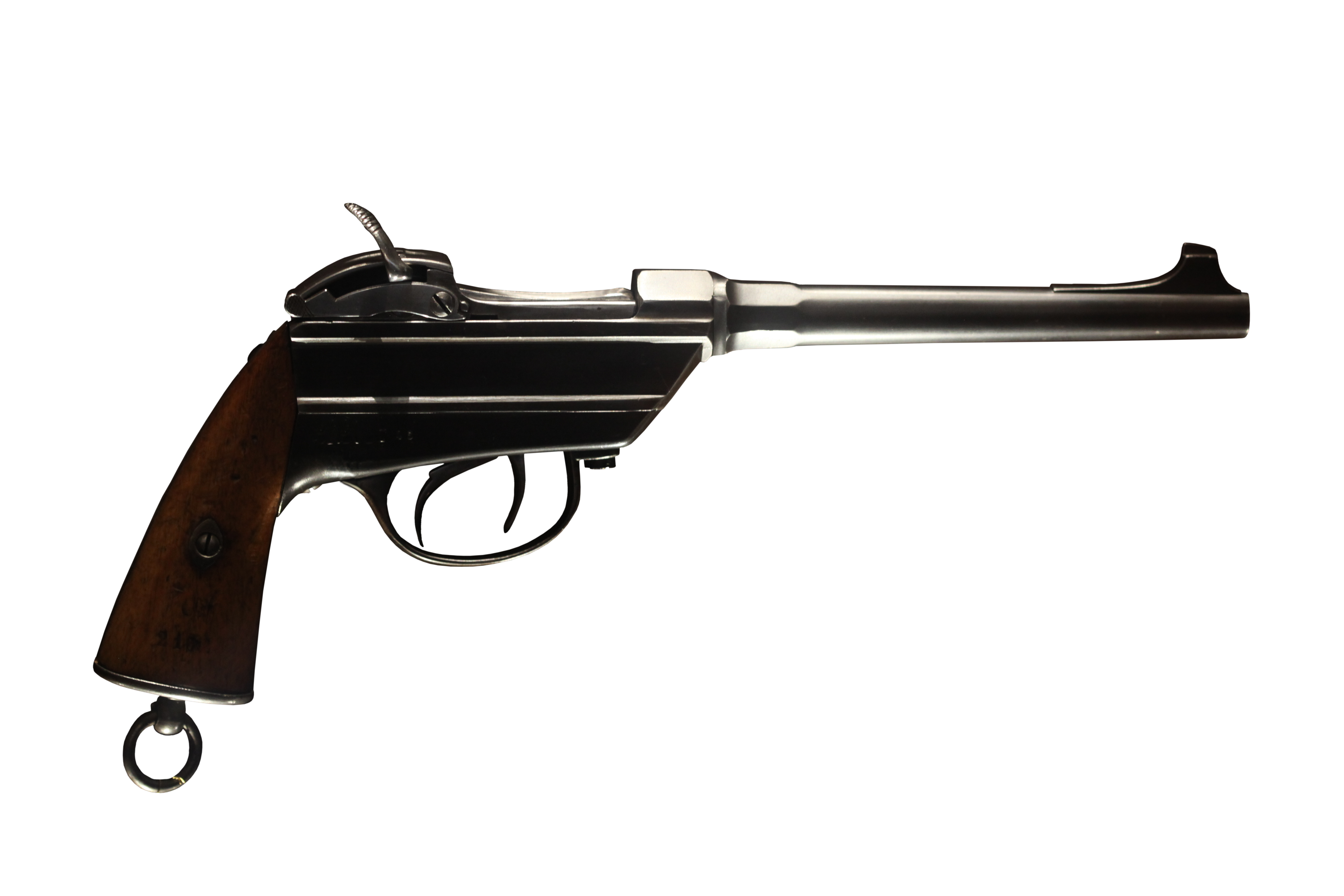
- Type: Service pistol
- Place of origin: (Kingdom of Bavaria) Bavaria

Production history
- Designer: Johann Ludwig Werder
- Designed: 1869

Specifications
- Cartridge: 11.5mm
- Calibre: 11.5mm
- Action: Falling block
- Sights: Fixed front blade and rear notch

The Werder pistol model 1869 was an infantry and light cavalry falling block pistol invented by Johann Ludwig Werder in Bavaria and based on his rifle design of 1868. It was one of the first centerfire pistols to be adopted for use by a European military.

Although it was originally known as the "Bavarian Lightning pistol" because of its rate of fire, the Werder pistol was proved to be too heavy for practical use and not used during the Franco-Prussian War.

It was also phased out by the Dreyse Rifles still used by 1870 and put into training service in 1891 with the introduction of the Gewehr 88.
