= Smith & Wesson Safety Hammerless =

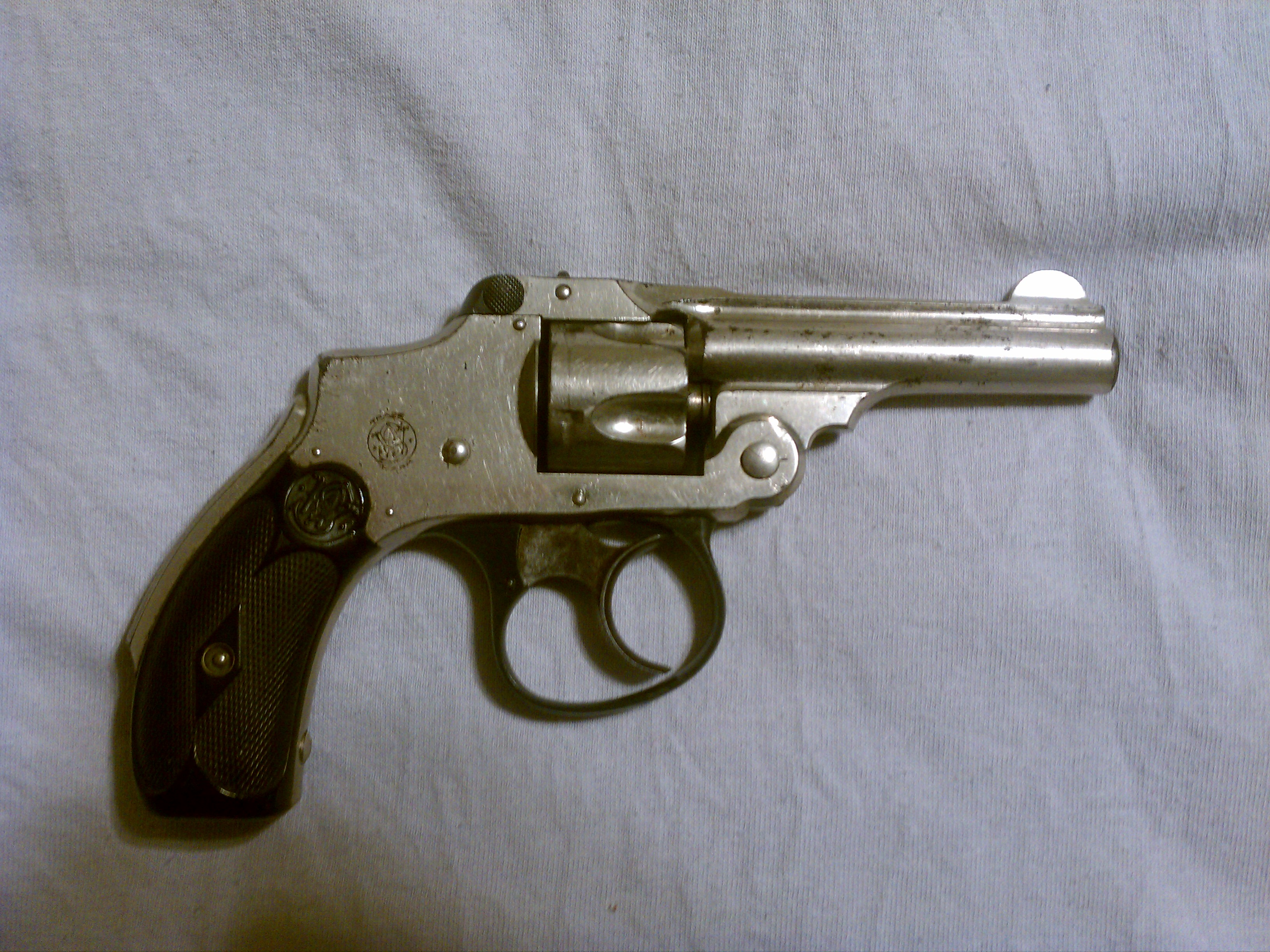
- Smith & Wesson Safety Hammerless Revolver
- Type: Revolver
- Place of origin: United States

Production history
- Manufacturer: Smith & Wesson
- Produced: 1887–1940

Specifications
- Caliber: .38 S&W Blackpowder.32 S&W
- Action: Double Action
- Feed system: 5-round cylinder
- Sights: Fixed

The Smith & Wesson Safety Hammerless or Smith & Wesson New Departure (nicknamed by collectors as the Lemon Squeezer) is a double-action revolver that was produced from 1887 to 1940 by Smith & Wesson. Based on the Smith & Wesson Model 2 double-action design, the revolver incorporated an internal hammer and an external grip safety on its back-strap. It was chambered in .32 S&W and .38 S&W calibers; these revolvers were discontinued prior to World War II, being eclipsed by the stronger hand ejector models.

== .32 and .38 Safety Hammerless models ==
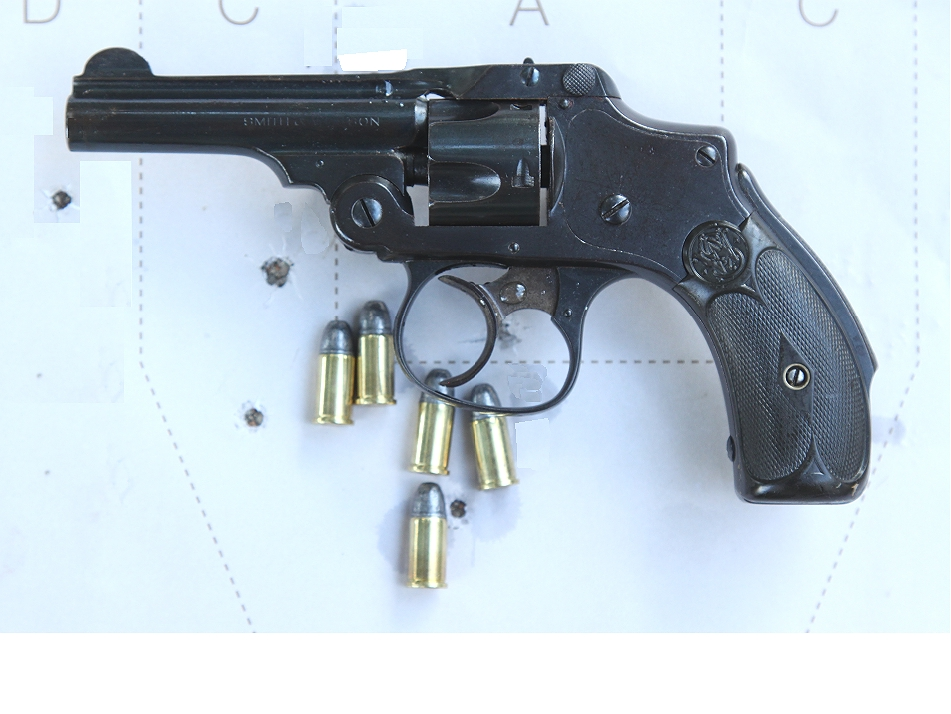
Smith & Wesson New Departure .32 S&W fired one-handed from 15 yards.

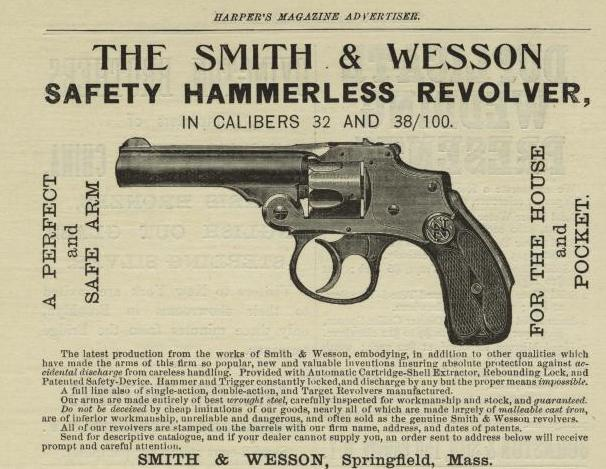
Smith & Wesson Safety Hammerless advertisement from 1899, as published in Harper's Magazine

The Smith & Wesson .38 Safety Hammerless models were produced from 1887 (1888 for the 32) to just before World War II. They were chambered in either .32 S&W or .38 S&W with a five-shot cylinder. They were most often produced with a 2-inch, 3-inch, or 3.5-inch barrels; but some 6" barrelled versions are known to exist.

These top-break revolvers were designed for fast reloading and concealed carry as the hammer was internal and would not snag on drawing the revolver from a pocket. They were known as "The New Departure" to reflect the company's new approach to designing revolvers.

Minor design changes were made to these revolvers over the years, resulting in several different design models, as termed by collectors. The first model was manufactured from 1887 to 1902. The .38 was based on S&W's medium frame, while the .32 was based on the smaller sized "1½" frame.

== Return of the hammerless ==
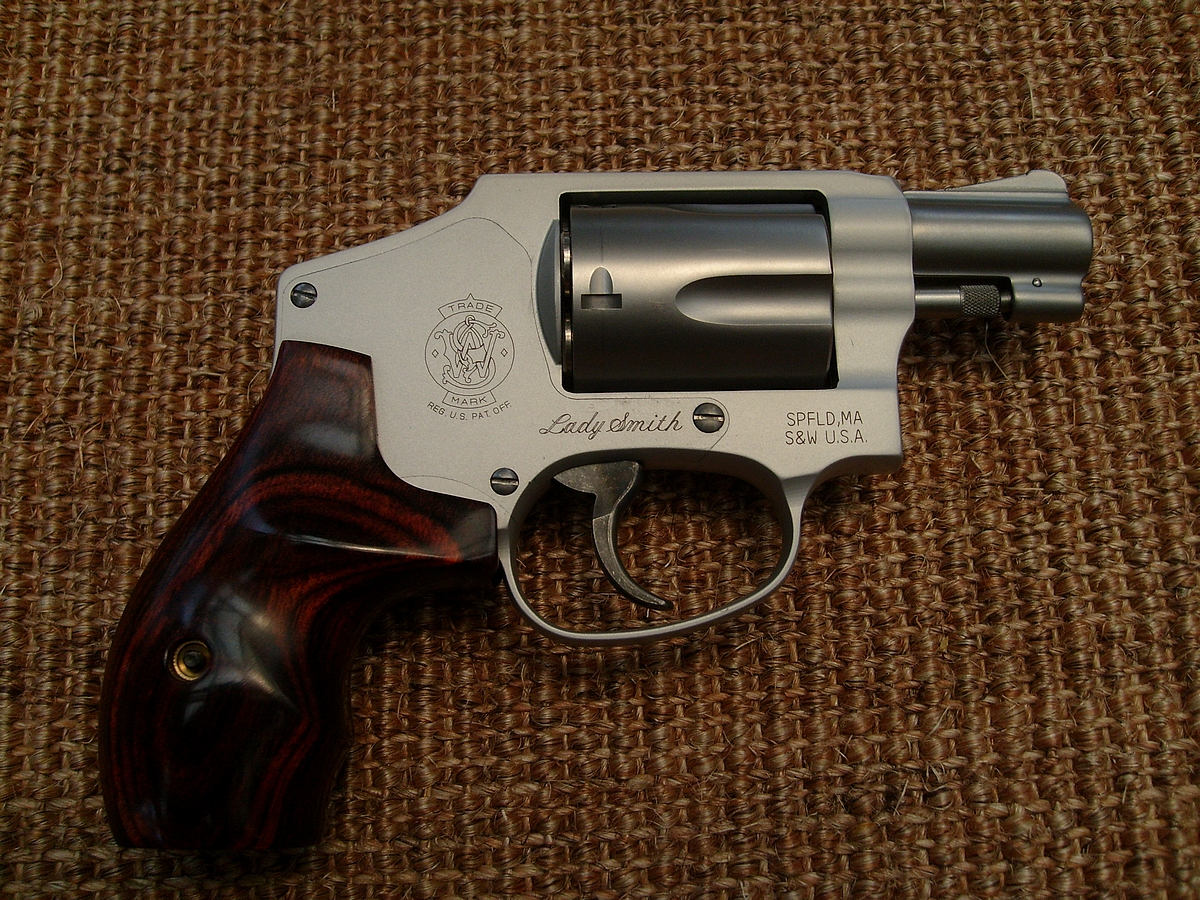
Smith & Wesson Model 642 Ladysmith in .38 Special

In 1952 the safety hammerless concept was applied to Smith & Wesson's J-frame. The finished product became the Model 40 and 42 chambered in .38 Special and is alternately known as the Smith & Wesson Centennial as it was produced in the 100th anniversary of the founding of Smith & Wesson. While few competitors replicated the grip safety, the internal hammer or "hammerless" design proved popular with other manufacturers such as Iver Johnson and Harrington & Richardson. The Centennial (without grip safeties) are still made by S&W, and have been copied by other revolver manufacturers.
