= Garrucha (pistol) =

Small handgun common in Brazil and Argentina in the early 20th century

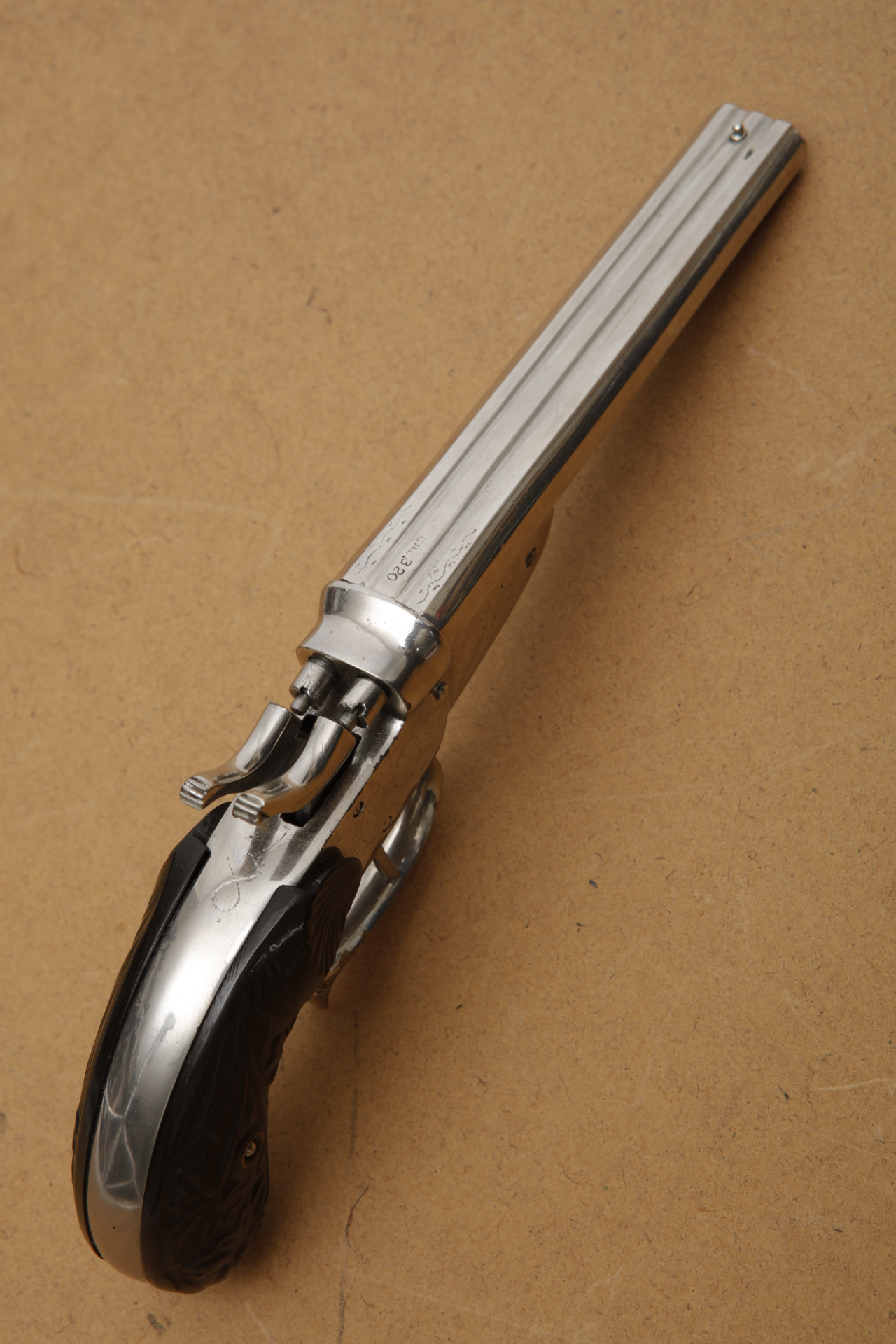
- A Garrucha in .320 caliber.
- Type: Pistol
- Place of origin: Brazil

Production history
- Manufacturer: Castilo; Rossi; Lerap
- Produced: Circa 1930s–1960s

Specifications
- Cartridge: .320.380.32 S&W.38 S&W.22 Short.22 Long.22 Long Rifle; 8mm 9mm Flobert
- Barrels: 1 or 2
- Action: Single Action, break action
- Sights: Iron

The garrucha is a small rifled or smoothbore pistol, similar to a derringer, which was common in Brazil and Argentina in the early 20th century. Even though single-shot variants exist, it is usually double-barreled with the barrels in a side-by-side layout, rather than the more common over-and-under layout of many derringer designs.

In Brazil, the most popular chamberings were for the .320 and .380 centerfire cartridges, similar to the .32 S&W and .38 S&W in appearance, but conical. They were also chambered for the .22 Short, .22 Long, .22 Long Rifle, and the .32, 8mm, and 9mm Flobert cartridges, among others.

These types of pistols were popular from about 1930 to 1960 due to their low cost and small size and were associated with the gauchos (cowboys) of the South American Pampas.

In Brazil, Garruchas were produced by Castelo, Rossi, and Lerap.

== See also ==
- Derringer – Small handgun
- Howdah pistol – 19th-century handgun used in colonies of the British Empire
