= Walch Revolver =

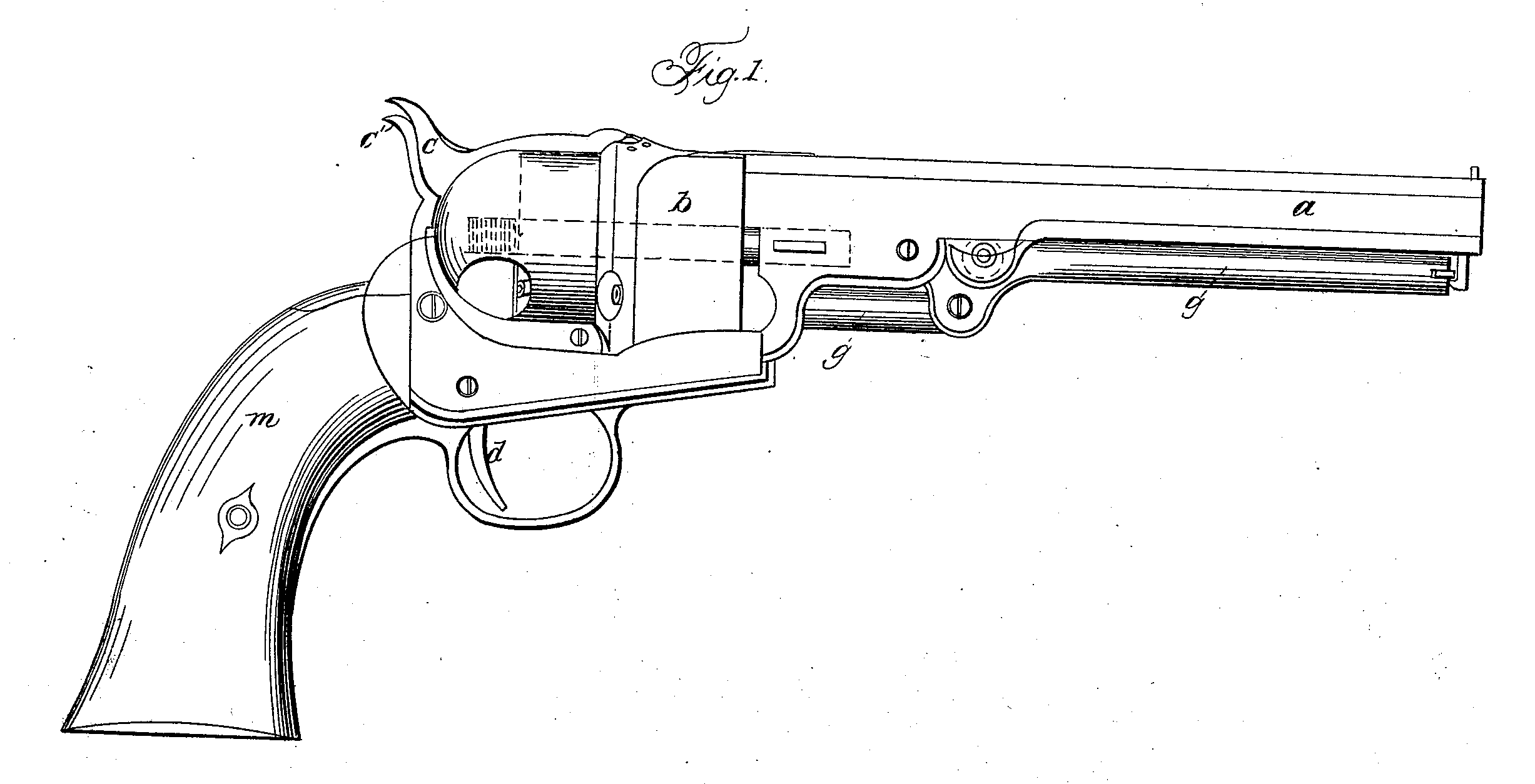
- Drawing of the Walch Revolver from the patent application
- Type: Revolver
- Place of origin: United States

Service history
- Wars: American Civil War; American Indian Wars

Production history
- Designer: John Walch
- Designed: February 8, 1859
- Manufacturer: Walch Firearms & Co.
- No. built: ~200
- Variants: Five-chamber & six-chamber models

The Walch Revolver is a .36 caliber cap and ball black powder revolving action handgun, designed by Walch Firearms & Co. The revolver was patented in 1859 by John Walch.

== Variants ==
The revolver has two variants; a five-chamber model and a six-chamber model. Each variant is capable of firing two shots per chamber, when completely loaded. There are two hammers, and depending on the model, one or two triggers.

== Production history ==
Roughly 200 Walch Revolvers were produced between 1859 and 1862, making them quite rare.
