= Smith & Wesson Model 1 1/2 =

- A Smith & Wesson Model 1 1/2, 1st Issue in blue steel.
- Type: Revolver
- Place of origin: United States

Production history
- Manufacturer: Smith & Wesson
- Produced: 1865-1892
- No. built: approx. 26,000 (1st Issue), 100,000 (2nd Issue), 97,000 (Single Action)

Specifications
- Caliber: .32 rimfire Blackpowder; .32 S&W ("Single Action" model)
- Action: Single action
- Feed system: 5-round cylinder
- Sights: Fixed

The Smith & Wesson Model 1 1/2 was Smith & Wesson's second .32 caliber revolver, intended to combine the small size and convenience of the .22 caliber Model 1 with the larger caliber of the 6-shot "belt sized" Model 2, which was introduced in 1861. Chambered in .32 Rimfire, its cylinder held 5 shots. It was produced in three varieties from 1865 through 1892, with total production exceeding 223,000.

== Issues ==
The Model 1 1/2 had three issues. The first two (known as the first and second issues) were "tip-up" revolvers with the barrel release catch located on the side of the frame in front of the trigger, while the third (known as the "Model 1 1/2 Single Action Revolver") was a "top-break", with the barrel release catch located on the top of the frame, just in front of the hammer.

=== 1st Issue ===
The first issue of the Model 1 1/2 can be identified by its smooth cylinder (lacking fluting), and the square shape of the grip butt. Models were available in blued or nickel-plated finishes, and the majority were produced with 3 1/2-inch barrels. A less common 4-inch barrel variety was also sold.

Serial numbers range from 1 through to approximately 26,300.

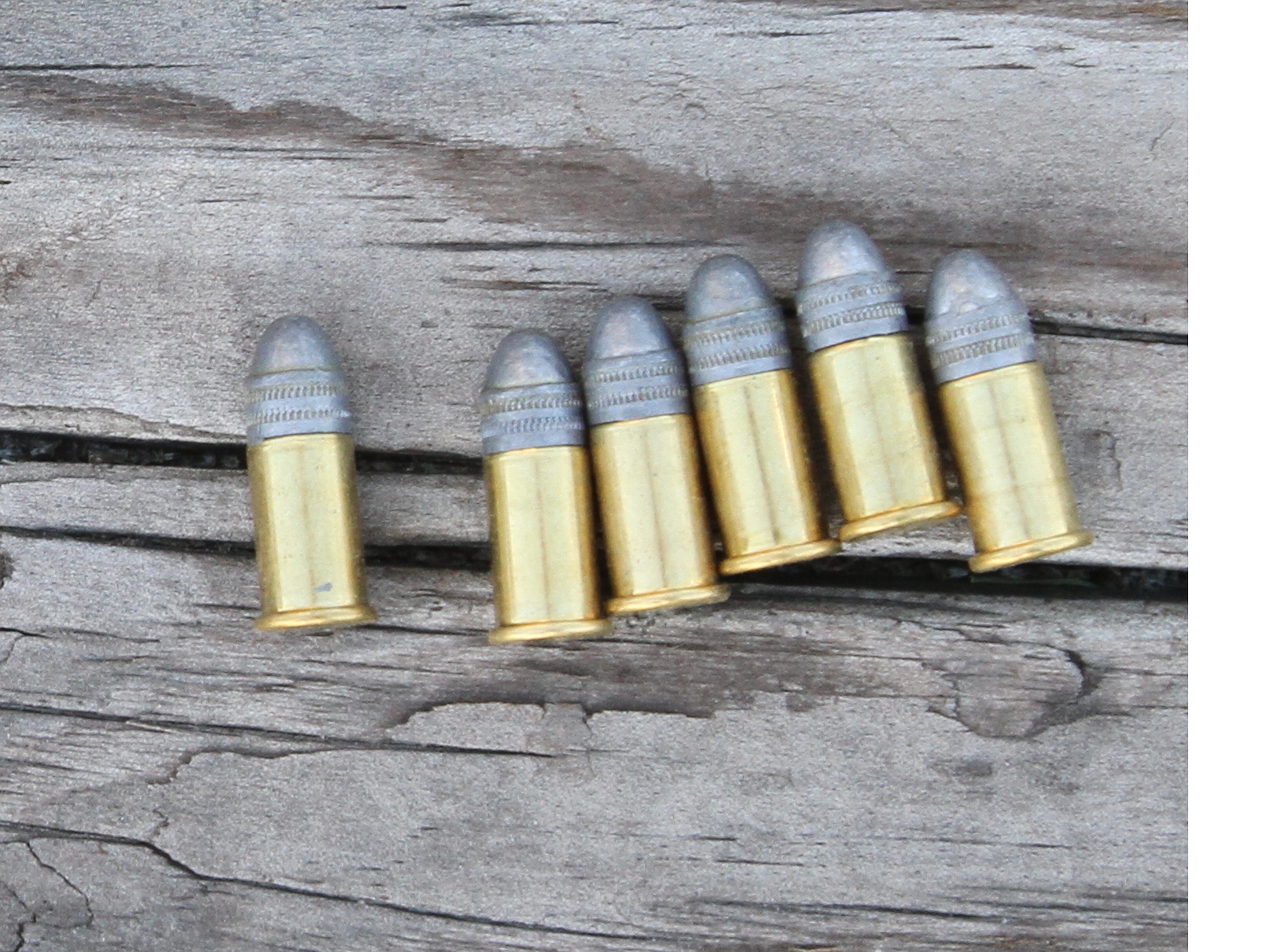
.32 Smith & Wesson rimfire cartridges for use in the Model 1 1/2 and Model 2 revolvers. These were loaded in Brazil-mid-20th century at the request of Navy Arms Company

=== 2nd Issue ===
The second issue of the Model 1 1/2 can be identified by its fluted barrel and the rounded shape of the grip butt. Like the 1st Issue, it was also produced in blued steel and nickel-plated varieties, with most models having a 3 1/2-inch barrel. It is estimated that less than a thousand models were produced with a 2 1/2-inch barrel; these can be positively identified by the barrel markings located on the side of the barrel, as opposed to the markings on the top strap that were applied to 3 1/2-inch barrels.

2nd Issue guns were serial numbered consecutively after the 1st Issue, with numbers ranging from approximately 26,300 through 127,000.

There is also a transitional model 2nd issue that uses the unfluted 1st issue barrels. The serial numbers for these transitional models span approximately 27,200 through 28,800.

=== Single Action Revolver ===
The third issue of the Model 1 1/2 is known as the "Model 1 1/2 Single Action Revolver". It differs substantially from the first two issues by breaking at the top (just in front of the hammer), consistent with the design of the Safety Hammerless or S&W .38 Single Action. It can be readily distinguished from the first two issues by its lack of ejector rod under the barrel, the large hinge in front of, and just below the barrel, and the extractor that ejects spent cartridges when the barrel is hinged downward. The grip is rounded at the butt, and is similar in appearance to that on the 2nd Issue. This revolver marked the debut of the .32 S&W centerfire cartridge.

Serial numbers ranged from 1 to approximately 97,500.
