= Smith & Wesson Model 320 =

Revolving rifle

Smith & Wesson Model 320 Revolving Rifle
- Type: Rifle revolver
- Place of origin: United States

Production history
- Manufacturer: Smith & Wesson
- Produced: 1879–1887
- Variants: H

Specifications
- Caliber: .32
- Action: Single Action
- Feed system: 6-round cylinder
- Sights: Fixed front post and rear notch

The Smith & Wesson Model 320 was a revolving rifle produced by Smith & Wesson in the late 19th century. It is one of the rarest Smith & Wesson models in existence. Generally considered the rarest Smith and Wesson ever made.

977 revolving rifles were manufactured between 1879 and 1887. They were serial numbered 1 to 977, with 840 being sold in the U.S. while 137 were exported.

The revolving cylinder design, while popular with pistols, did not work well for rifles. The cylinder would spray out burning powder when the weapon was fired. This was not a problem for pistols, as both hands were behind the cylinder when firing. In the rifle version, though, the shooter's left hand was in front of the cylinder, resulting in the burning powder fragments being sprayed into the shooter's left forearm at high velocity. This undesirable characteristic significantly limited the revolving rifle's popularity.

== Design and features ==
The model 320 revolving rifle used a top break frame similar to that used on the model 3 pistol, and featured a detachable stock.

The revolving rifle used a special .32 caliber cartridge. The use of a cartridge was a significant improvement compared to the design of the Colt revolving rifle, which did not use cartridges and as a result was often subject to chain fire problems (the firing of all cylinders at once due to loose powder or residue in the weapon). While the Smith & Wesson Model 320 did not suffer from chain fire problems, the Model 320, like the Colt, tended to spray burning powder from the cylinder into the shooter's forearm.

Three barrel lengths were available, in 16, 18 and 20 inches.
