= .32 S&W =

Revolver cartridge designed by the Smith & Wesson Company (S&W)

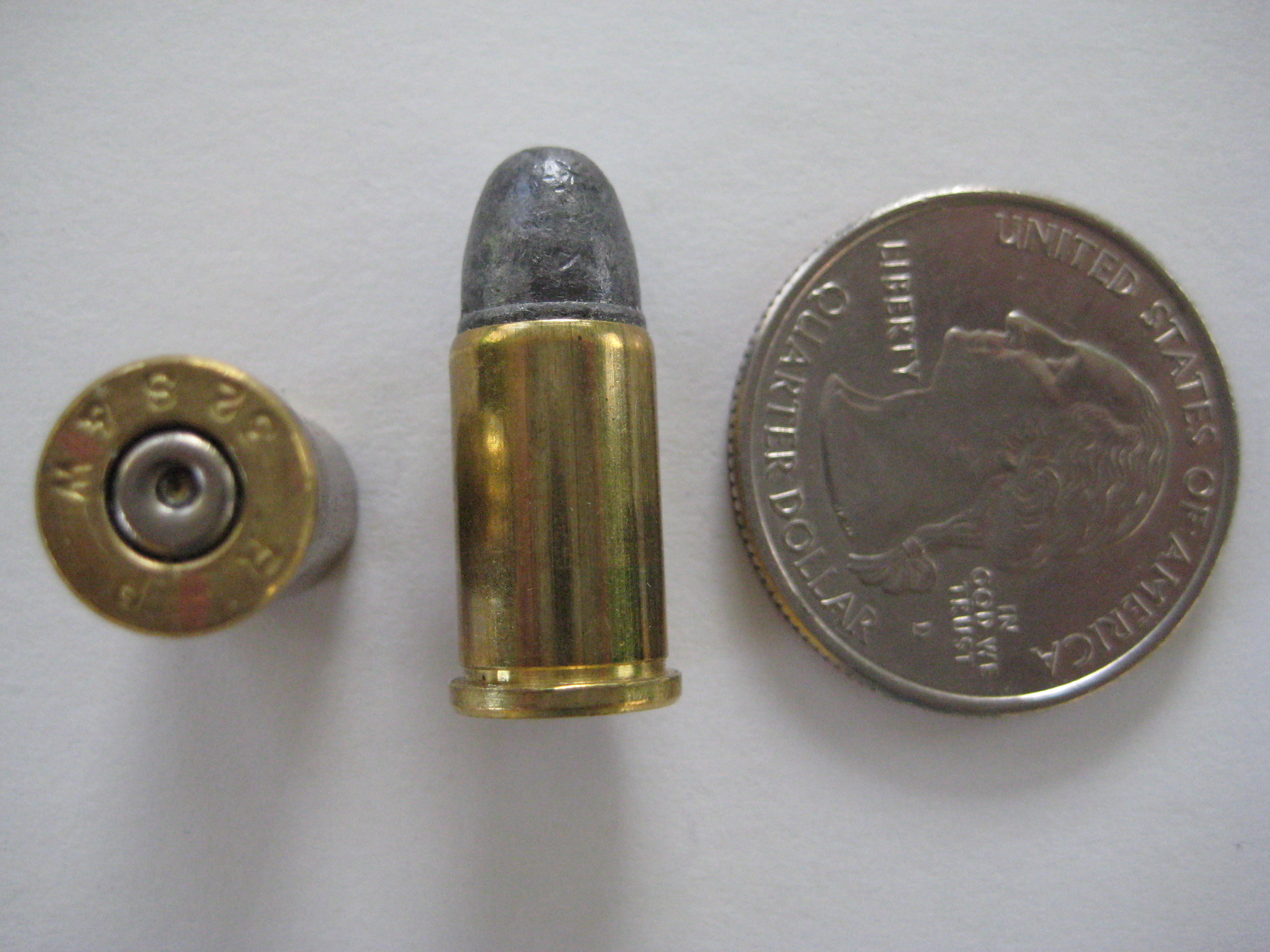
- Type: Handgun
- Place of origin: United States

Production history
- Designer: Smith & Wesson
- Designed: 1878
- Produced: 1878–present

Specifications
- Parent case: .320 Revolver
- Case type: Rimmed, straight
- Bullet diameter: .312 in (7.9 mm)
- Neck diameter: .334 in (8.5 mm)
- Base diameter: .335 in (8.5 mm)
- Rim diameter: .375 in (9.5 mm)
- Rim thickness: .045 in (1.1 mm)
- Case length: .61 in (15 mm)
- Overall length: .92 in (23 mm)
- Primer type: Small pistol
- Maximum pressure: 12,000 psi (83 MPa)

Ballistic performance
Bullet mass/type	Velocity	Energy
85 (5.51 g) Lead	705 ft/s (215 m/s)	93 ft⋅lbf (126 J)
98 (6.35 g) Lead	705 ft/s (215 m/s)	108 ft⋅lbf (146 J)
86 (5.57 g) Lead	680 ft/s (210 m/s)	88 ft⋅lbf (119 J)
- Source: "Cartridges of the World"

The .32 S&W is a straight-walled, centerfire, rimmed handgun cartridge (also known as the .32 S&W Short), and was originally designed as a black powder cartridge. It was introduced in 1878 for Smith & Wesson pocket revolvers. The .32 S&W was offered to the public as a light defense cartridge for "card table" distances.

The .32 S&W Short was the basis for several other .32-caliber handgun cartridges. The .32 S&W Short can safely be fired in guns chambered for .32 S&W Long, .32 H&R Magnum and .327 Federal Magnum.

== Design ==
Designed by the Union Metallic Cartridge Company (UMC) as a black powder cartridge using nine grains of black powder, the round has been loaded with smokeless powder exclusively since 1940. It is low-powered and perfect for use in small frame concealable revolvers and derringers. The round remained popular in the United States and Europe long after the firearms chambered for it were out of production. At one time, it was considered to be the bare minimum for a self-defense round and was judged unsuitable for police work.

For defensive uses, the .32 S&W is grouped with other turn-of-the-century cartridges designed for use in "belly guns", which are guns meant for use in point-blank defensive situations, such as in a carriage or an alleyway. These cartridges include the .25 ACP, .22 Short, .22 Long, and .22 Long Rifle. For comparison, the .32 S&W projectile is over 40% larger in diameter and over twice as heavy as the 40 gr (2.6 g) lead round-nose bullet used in the standard velocity .22 Long Rifle of its day. The .32 S&W's velocity of approximately 700 feet per second (210 m/s) was very close to the .22 Long Rifle's performance from a sub-3-inch (76 mm) barrel, but with larger diameter and better sectional density.

Although the .32 S&W's round-nose bullet was less than optimal for defense, the centerfire design did offer a significant improvement in reliability over these other common handgun calibers of the day. This performance made guns chambered in the cartridge very popular as a gentleman's "vest gun" as evidenced by sales of around 5:1 based on surviving examples (.22 rimfire variants are significantly rarer). Having twice the bullet weight and similar velocity of .22 Long Rifle in the same platform, the .32 S&W has around double the muzzle energy of a .22 rimfire in similar-sized handguns.

== Derivatives ==
The .32 S&W Long cartridge is derived from the .32 S&W, by increasing the overall brass case length, to hold more powder. Since the .32 S&W headspaces on the rim and shares the rim dimensions and case and bullet diameters of the longer .32 S&W Long, the .32 H&R Magnum cartridges, and the .327 Federal Magnum, .32 S&W cartridges may be fired in arms chambered for these longer cartridges. Longer cartridges are unsafe in short chambers, so none of these longer and more powerful cartridges should be loaded into arms designed for the .32 S&W.

== Use in assassinations ==
Guns chambered in .32 S&W have been used in at least three notable assassinations:

- Gaetano Bresci used an Iver Johnson revolver chambered in .32 S&W to assassinate King Umberto I of Italy on July 29, 1900. Bresci hit his victim with four shots.
- Leon Czolgosz used an Iver Johnson revolver chambered in .32 S&W to assassinate United States President William McKinley at the Temple of Music in Buffalo, New York, on September 6, 1901. McKinley was shot twice in the abdomen at close range, and although he did not die immediately, he eventually succumbed to gangrene on September 14, 1901.
- Giuseppe Zangara used a United States Revolver Company (a subsidiary of Iver Johnson) revolver chambered in .32 S&W to assassinate Anton Cermak, Mayor of Chicago, on February 15, 1933, in what may have been an attempt to assassinate President-elect Franklin D. Roosevelt. Cermak was shot in the lung and died on March 6, 1933.

== Gallery ==
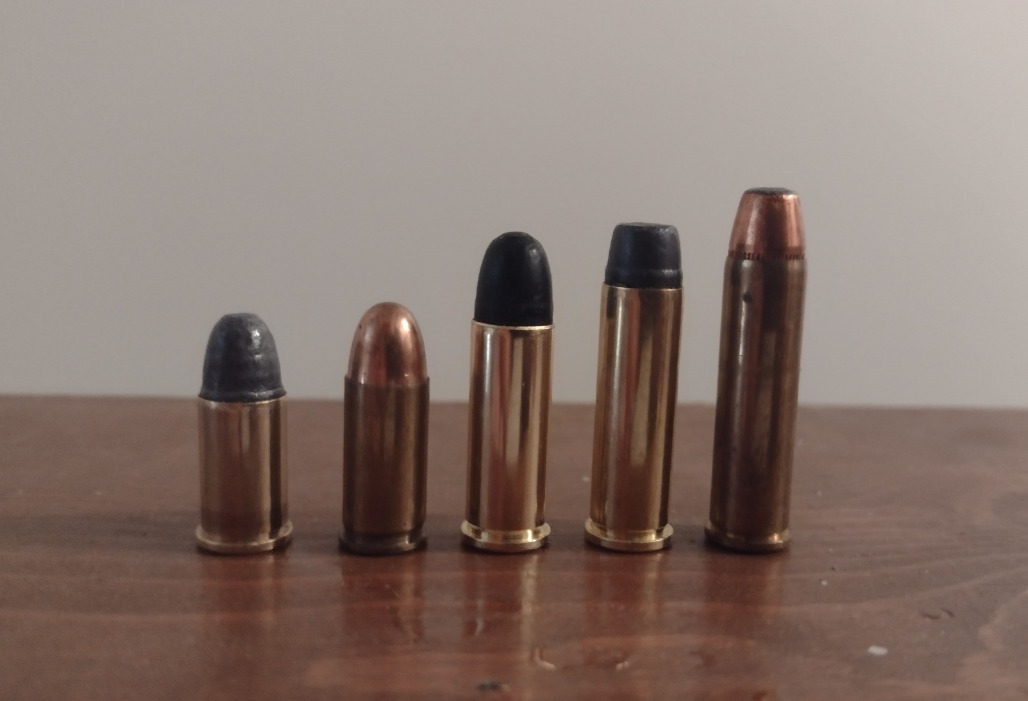
From left to right: .32 S&W, .32 ACP, .32 S&W Long, .32 H&R Magnum and .327 Federal Magnum.

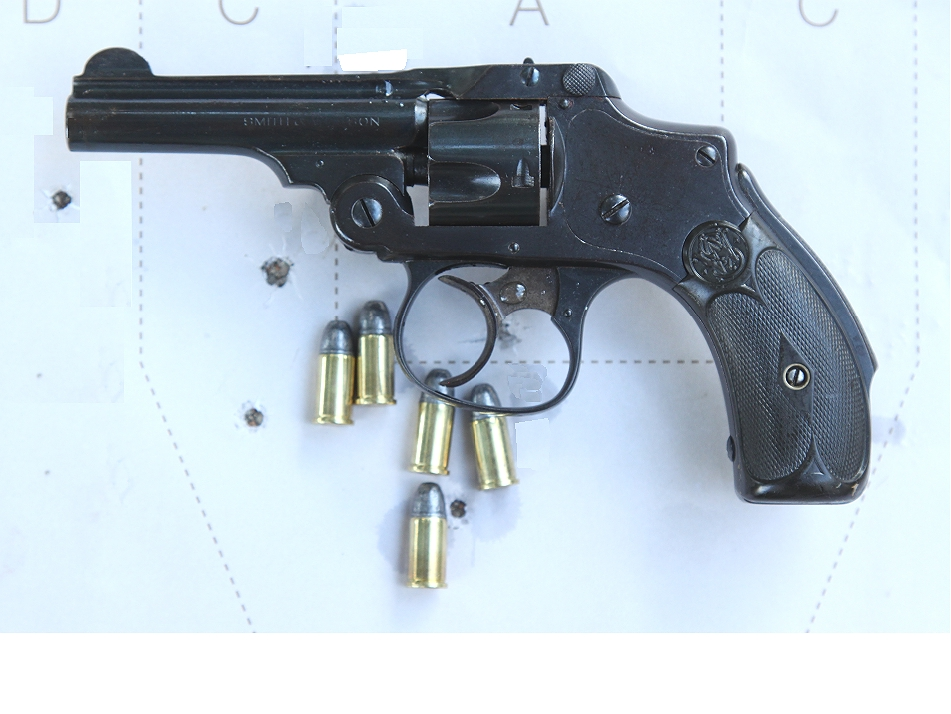
Smith & Wesson Lemon Squeezer example, chambered in .32 S&W

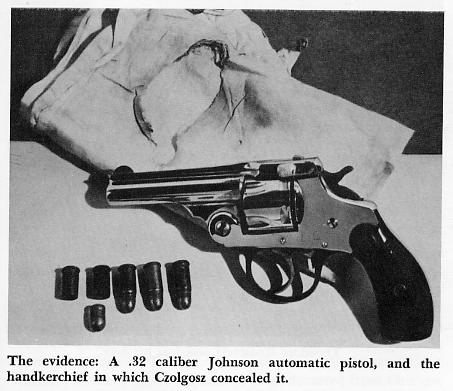
Revolver and cartridges used in the assassination of William McKinley

== Chambered weapons ==
Notable guns chambered in .32 S&W include:

- Colt Police Positive
- Smith & Wesson Lemon Squeezer
- Smith & Wesson Model 1 1/2
- Smith & Wesson Model 3
- Smith & Wesson Model 30
- Union Automatic Revolver

Other gun types, or gun manufacturers, using .32 S&W include:

- Forehand & Wadsworth
- Garrucha
- Iver Johnson
- Merwin Hulbert
- Röhm Gesellschaft
- Series ALFA Steel

== See also ==
- 8 mm caliber
- List of handgun cartridges
- Table of handgun and rifle cartridges
