= Smith & Wesson Model No. 2 Army =

Smith & Wesson Model No 2 Army
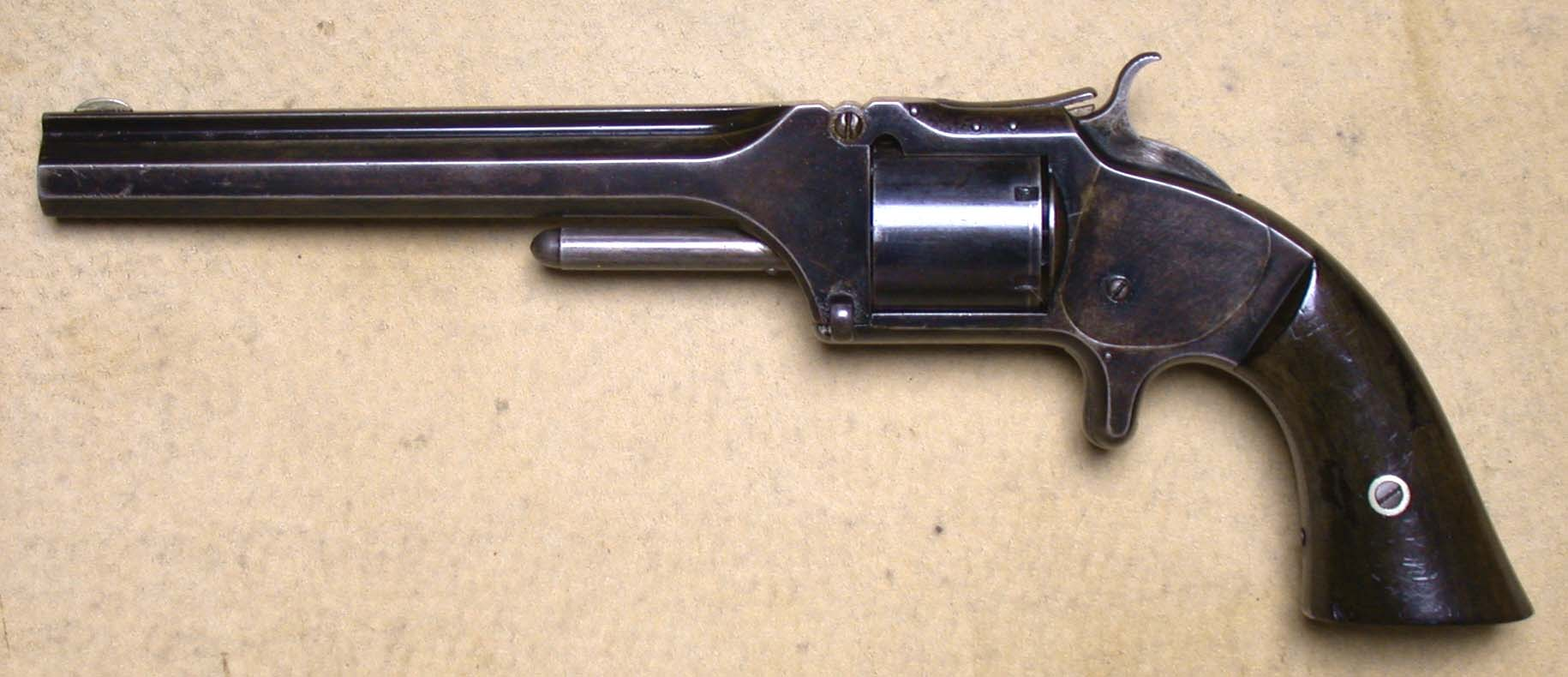
- Smith & Wesson Model No 2 Army
- Type: Revolver
- Place of origin: United States

Production history
- Manufacturer: Smith & Wesson
- Produced: 1861–1874
- No. built: approx. 77,020

Specifications
- Caliber: .32 rimfire
- Action: Single-action
- Feed system: 6-round cylinder
- Sights: Fixed

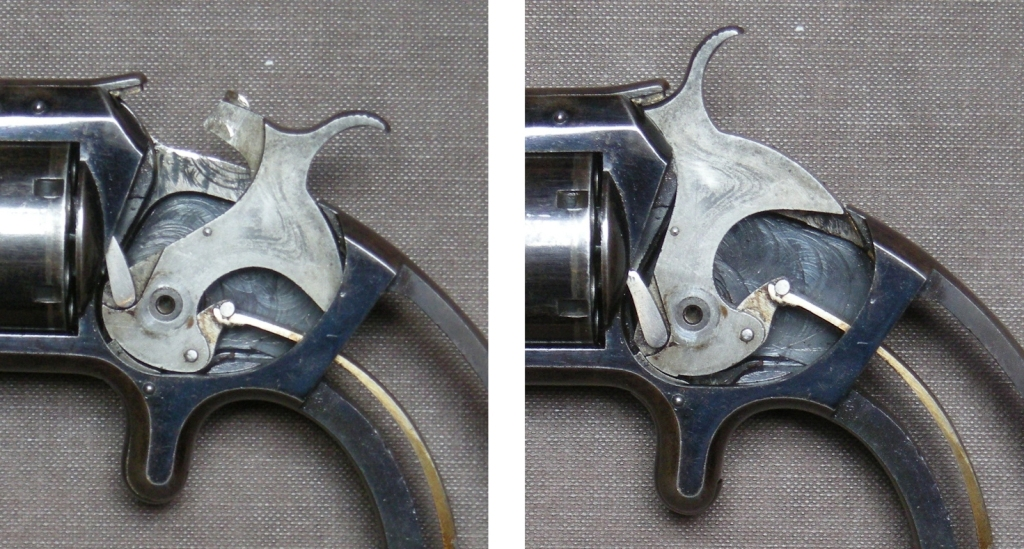
S&W 2nd Model, lock

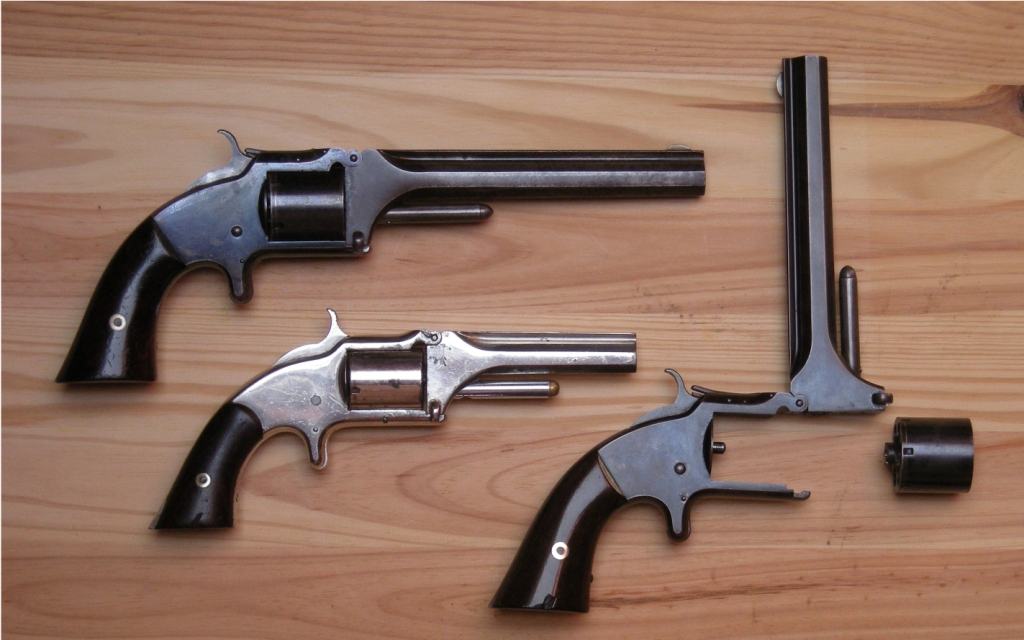
S&W Model 2 Army, one in loading position and Model 1 1/2 tip up cal 32 rimfire revolvers

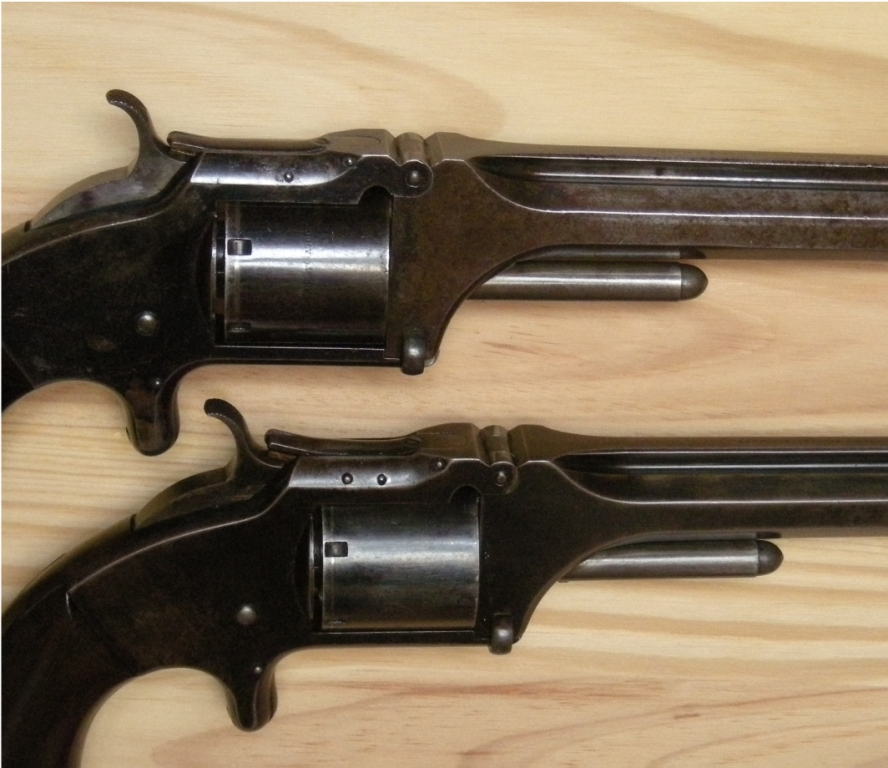
Upper gun early 2 pin variant, lower gun 3 pins

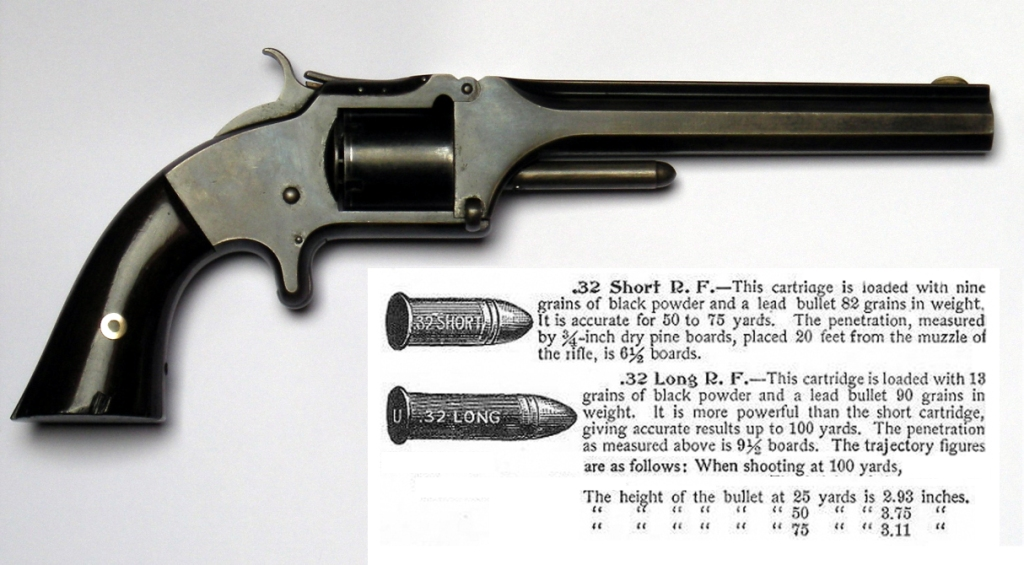
S&W Army No 2, Cartridges .32 R.F.

The Smith & Wesson Model No. 2 Army a.k.a. Model No. 2 Old Model Smith & Wesson Revolver was Smith & Wesson's first .32 caliber revolver, intended to combine the small size and convenience of the Smith & Wesson Model 1 .22 rimfire with a larger caliber. Chambered in the .32 rimfire long caliber, its cylinder held 6 shots. It was manufactured 1861 - 1874, with a total production of 77,020.

== Development ==
Horace Smith and Daniel B. Wesson founded the Smith & Wesson Company in Norwich, Connecticut, to develop Volcanic Firearms, in 1855 the company was renamed Volcanic Repeating Arms and was sold to Oliver Winchester. As Samuel Colt's patent on the revolver was set to expire in 1856, Wesson began developing a prototype for a cartridge revolver with a "Bored-through" cylinder. A former employee of the Colt's Manufacturing Company named Rollin White, who held the patent for the "Bored-through" cylinder, was contacted, and Smith & Wesson proposed to pay him a royalty of $0.25 on every revolver that they made. The deal allowed Smith & Wesson to develop and produce the first cartridge revolver, the Smith & Wesson Model 1 in caliber .22 rimfire.

=== Function ===
The Smith & Wesson Model 2 Army is a single action tip-up revolver, on which the barrel pivoted upwards, hinged on the forward end of the topstrap. It can be identified by its octagonal barrel, smooth cylinder (lacking fluting) and the flat shape of the grip butt. The revolvers were available in blued or nickel-plated finishes and the majority were produced with 5 or 6-inch barrels. 4-inch barrels were rare and a few revolvers with 8 and 10-inch barrels an extreme rarity.

A difference between the early S & W Army No 2 Model, serial range 1 to about 3000 and later revolvers, is the addition of third pin to the top strap to limit the travel upwards of the cylinder stop.

== History ==
=== The American Civil War ===
For a Civil War soldier, owning a revolver as a backup gun was important, so Smith & Wesson's cartridge revolvers, the Army Model 2 and the Smith & Wesson Model 1 in caliber .22 rimfire came into popular demand with the outbreak of the American Civil War. Soldiers and officers on both sides of the conflict made private purchases of the revolvers for self-defense. Specimens of the model 2 under serial number 35,731 (produced by May 1. 1865) have a high probability of being used in the Civil War. The model 1.5 came into production after the war ended, in 1865.

George Armstrong Custer is known to have owned a pair of cased and engraved S & W Army Model 2 revolvers.

During the Civil War, the State of Kentucky purchased 700 of the S & W Army 2 revolvers from the arms dealer B. Kittredge & Company (based in Cincinnati) and issued them to the 7th Regiment Kentucky Volunteer Cavalry.

Novelist Ernest Hemingway’s paternal grandfather, Anson Hemingway, carried a “Long John” .32 revolver as a first lieutenant in 72nd Illinois Infantry Regiment during the American Civil War. His son—and Hemingway’s father, Clarence—committed suicide with the same weapon in 1928.

=== Western Frontier ===
At the close of the Civil War, demand for the S & W Army Model 2 declined and Smith & Wesson focused on the development of arms in heavier calibers suitable for use on the American frontier.

February 1868, in a deal with Remington Arms, Smith & Wesson allowed Remington to convert Remington Model 1858 Percussion Cap revolvers into metallic cartridge .46 rimfire conversions using the Rollin White patent, against payment of a royalty fee.

In 1869 the company developed a large frame break action single action revolver with an automatic empty case ejector, first produced 1870, in the calibers .44 S&W American and .44 Henry. The design is known as the Smith & Wesson Model 3.

The famed American frontiersman and gunslinger Wild Bill Hickok was known to carry a No. 2 later in his life. Following his 1876 murder in Deadwood it was sold along with his personal effects to help pay for burial expenses, in 2022 it was auctioned for $235,000.

=== Teradaya Incident ===
Sakamoto Ryōma used a S&W Model 2 to defend himself from an assassination attempt by 10 spearmen, later writing his account in a letter to his family.

== Sources ==
- Sindelar, Nancy W. 2025. Hemingway’s Passions: His Women, His Wars, and His Writing. Lyons Press Books, Essex, Connecticut. ISBN 978-1-4930-8468-5
