= List of weapons of the Spanish–American War =

This is a list of weapons of the Spanish–American War. The Spanish–American War was a conflict in 1898 between Spain and the United States, effectively the result of American intervention in the ongoing Cuban War of Independence.

== United States ==
=== Offensive weapons ===
Edged weapons

- Bolo knife (used by Philippine Revolutionary Army)
- Bowie knife (also known as hunter)
- Cutlass
- Krag M1892/98 bayonet
- M1860 light cavalry saber
- Machete (used mostly by Cuban rebels)
- Mameluke sword
- Sabre
- United States Marine Corps noncommissioned officer's sword

Sidearms

- Colt M1871/72 Open Top
- Colt M1873 Single Action Army
- Colt M1877
- Colt M1878
- Colt M1889
- Colt M1892
- Colt M1898 New Service
- Merwin & Hulbert Pocket Army
- Remington M1875
- Remington M1890
- Smith & Wesson No.3
- Smith & Wesson Safety Hammerless

Shotguns

- Coach gun
- Winchester M1887 and M1901
- Winchester M1893 and M1897

Rifles

- Colt-Burgess rifle
- Colt Lightning Carbine
- Lee M1895 Navy
- Remington–Lee M1885
- Remington Rolling Block rifle
- Spanish Mauser M1893 (used by Cuban rebels and Philippine Revolutionary Army)
- Springfield M1873
- Springfield M1884
- Springfield M1888
- Springfield M1892/99
- Winchester Hotchkiss M1876
- Winchester M1873 (used by Cuban rebels)
- Winchester M1886
- Winchester M1892
- Winchester M1894
- Winchester M1895

Explosives and grenades

- Dynamite
- Ketchum grenade

Machine guns

- Colt–Browning M1895 machine gun
- Gatling machine gun

Artillery

- M1875 mountain gun
- 3.2-inch M1897 field cannon
- Dynamite gun
- Hotchkiss cannon
- Hotchkiss five barrel revolver cannon

== Spain ==
=== Offensive weapons ===
Edged weapons

- M1874 Spanish cavalry spear
- M1875 Spanish officer sabre
- Spanish Mauser M1893 bayonet

Sidearms

- MAS M1892
- Mauser C96
- Mauser Zig-Zag
- Orbea No.7 (Smith & Wesson No.7)
- Smith & Wesson No.3

Shotguns

- Double-barreled shotgun

Rifles

- Remington Rolling Block rifle
- Spanish Mauser M1893

Explosives and grenades

- Orsini bomb
- Dynamite

Machine guns

- Maxim machine gun

Artillery

- Krupp kanone

=== Defensive weapons ===
Shields and body armor

- M1881 Spanish cavalry cuirass
- M1881 Spanish cavalry helmet
- Soldado cuera Spanish shield

== See also ==
- List of weapons of the Philippine revolution
