= 2013 Santa Monica shootings =

Shooting spree in Santa Monica, California, US

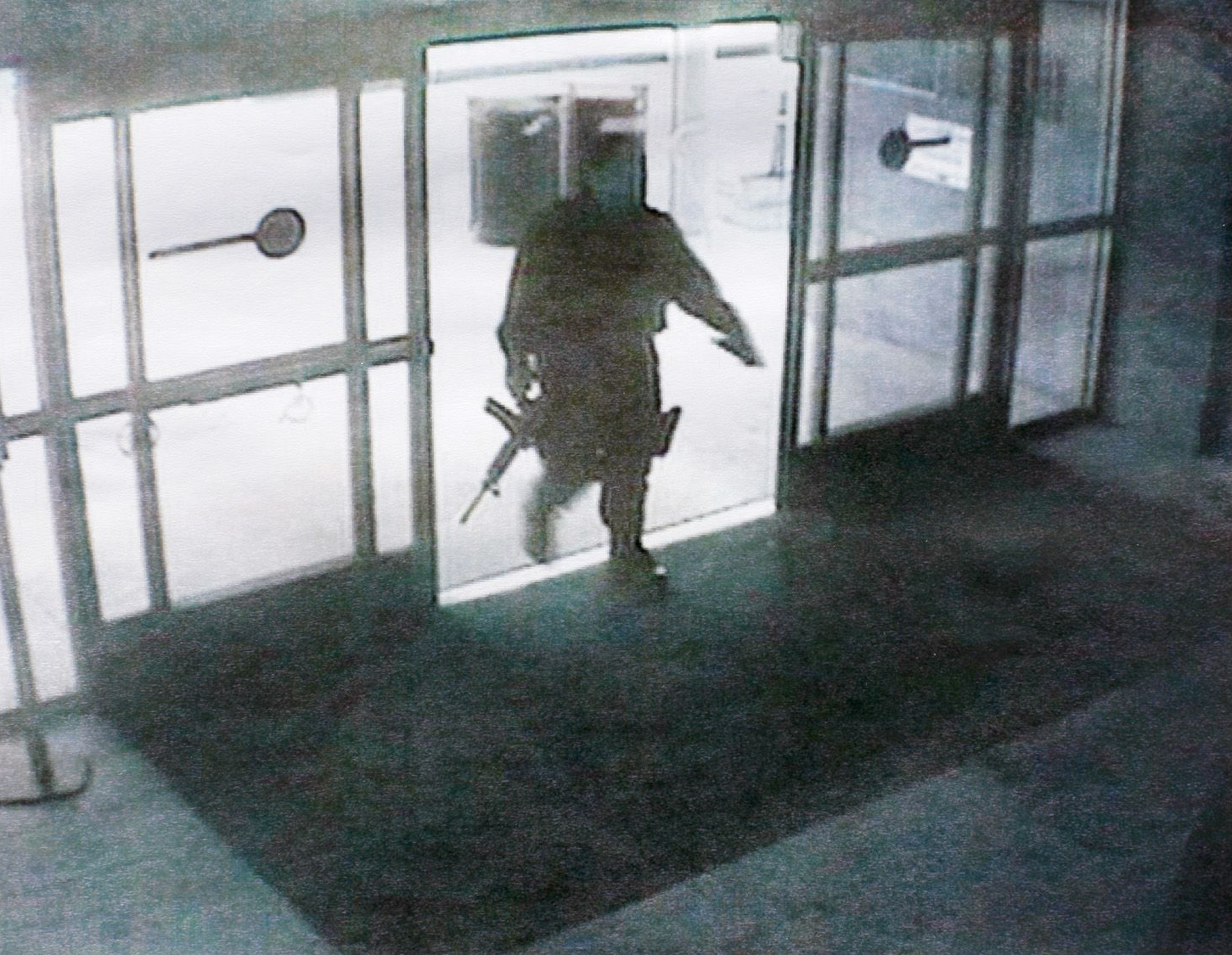
- A photo of Zawahri heading into the building with his AR-15.

- Location of Santa Monica within Los Angeles County, in the state of California.
- Location: 34.0188290°N 118.4700428°W; Santa Monica, California, U.S.
- Date: June 7, 2013; 11:52 a.m. – 12:05 p.m. (PDT; UTC−07:00)
- Attack type: Spree shooting; school shooting; patricide; fratricide; arson; shootout; mass shooting; mass murder
- Weapons: (privately made) AR-15-style semi-automatic rifle; Pietta Model 1858 New Army revolver (unused)
- Deaths: 6 (including the perpetrator and his father and brother at home)
- Injuries: 4 (2 by gunfire)
- Perpetrator: John Samir Zawahri
- Motive: Inconclusive

On June 7, 2013, a spree shooting occurred in Santa Monica, California. The incident began with a domestic dispute and subsequent fire at a home, followed by a series of shootings near and on the Santa Monica College campus. Five people were killed, and four others were injured. The perpetrator, 23-year-old John Zawahri, was killed by police officers when he exchanged gunfire with them at the Santa Monica College library.

== Events ==
=== Family murders and arson ===
The California Highway Patrol received a phone call at 11:52 a.m. PDT on June 7, 2013, of shots fired. Upon arrival, police called the fire department when they saw a house on fire, located at 2036 Yorkshire Avenue, where Zawahri lived. After the fire was under control, the bodies of two men were found in the house, both having died from gunshot wounds.

=== Shooting spree ===
After setting fire to the house, 23-year-old Zawahri — armed with an AR-15-type semi-automatic rifle, which he assembled from legally purchased components (though he was legally prohibited from possessing firearms), some of which required machining with a mill — stopped a woman driving a Mazda hatchback, holding her at gunpoint. A passing female driver tried to intervene, and was shot and wounded by Zawahri. He then ordered the driver of the first car, a 41-year-old woman, to drive him to the Santa Monica College campus. Along the way, Zawahri shot at Big Blue Bus 4057, which was carrying approximately two dozen passengers, three of whom suffered injuries. A police cruiser was also fired upon. Upon arriving on the college campus, Zawahri shot into a Ford Explorer, killing the 68-year-old male driver and fatally wounding the passenger.

He then continued on foot toward the college library, fatally shooting another woman immediately outside. Entering the library, Zawahri opened fire on students inside, then focused his gunfire on a group of library employees barricaded in a storage room. Witnesses stated they heard gunshots and screams, but were able to hide or escape unharmed. While on the campus, he fired at least 70 rounds, and dropped a duffel bag loaded with magazines, boxes of ammunition and a .44 caliber revolver.

When police arrived at the college, they exchanged gunfire with Zawahri. He was shot by Santa Monica Police Officers Robert Sparks, Jason Salas and Santa Monica College Captain Ray Bottenfield inside the library, and then brought outside, where he died. According to an autopsy report, the shooter sustained 25 gunshot wounds. Authorities investigated up to nine crime scenes believed to be tied to the thirteen-minute-long shooting spree. Though Zawahri had been killed, officers actively searched the college campus for additional shooters and victims for over eight hours.

== Perpetrator ==
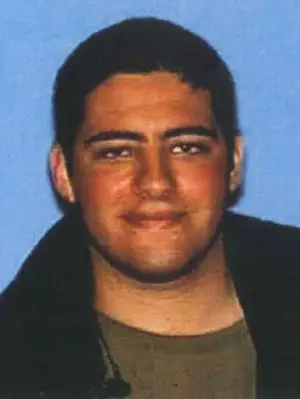
Undated photograph of Zawahri

John Samir Zawahri (June 8, 1989 – June 7, 2013) was identified by officials as the shooter on June 8. He was armed with an AR-15-type semiautomatic rifle, a .44 caliber black powder Pietta Model 1858 New Army revolver, and an additional upper receiver for the rifle. He was described as wearing black tactical clothing and "body armor" by his carjacking victim Laura Sisk, though it was later determined the tactical vest did not contain any type of armor. Sources said Zawahri had forty 30-round magazines in pouches in his clothing and in a bag he carried. Ammunition was strapped to his body as well as in pouches in his clothing and tactical vest. Law enforcement sources stated that they believed the attack was premeditated, citing the gunman's extensive armament and preparation.

In 2006, when Zawahri was a student at Olympic High School in Santa Monica, a teacher saw him surfing the Web for information on assault weapons and instructions on making explosive devices. School staff also learned that he had repeatedly made threats against students, teachers, and campus security officers. Within days, police were involved and bomb-making materials were found at his home. Zawahri was subsequently admitted to the UCLA Neuropsychiatric Institute. Zawahri was a student of Santa Monica High School before enrolling in Santa Monica College in the winter of 2009. The college had no disciplinary issues with Zawahri, officials said. He left the school in the fall of 2010.

=== Motive ===
The rampage allegedly started over an undetermined family dispute. Public records show that Zawahri's parents were married in 1985 and moved into the house they purchased on Yorkshire Avenue in 1996, but the mother, Randa Abdou, left the home and moved to an apartment with the two boys in 1998. She sought a restraining order against the father for domestic violence a short time later, but the case was dismissed when the mother failed to appear in court. Subsequently, the elder son lived with the father at the residence on Yorkshire Avenue, while Zawahri lived in an apartment in Mar Vista, Los Angeles with his mother. Though there is no record that the couple divorced, by 2013, they had been living separately for years. Randa Abdou was out of the country visiting relatives at the time of the shooting, but returned during the following weekend and was assisting authorities in the investigation.

Zawahri prepared a three-page handwritten note that was found on his body. In it, he expressed remorse for killing his father and brother, but did not give a motive. He said goodbye to friends and expressed hope that his mother would be taken care of and receive recompense from his father's estate. Investigators believe that mental illness played a role in the killings, but no details were given. Searching his home, police found replica weapons and illegal zip guns. It was also learned that the California Department of Justice advised Zawahri in an October 2011 letter that he was ineligible to purchase a firearm. The incident occurred the day before Zawahri's 24th birthday.

== Victims ==
Casualties
Killed Perpetrator's father: Samir Zawahri, 55 (shot at home)
Perpetrator's brother: Christopher Zawahri, 25 (shot at home)
Others: Carlos Navarro Franco, 68 (shot in vehicle); Marcela Diaz Franco, 26 (shot in vehicle); Margarita Gomez, 68 (shot outside college)
Perpetrator: John Zawahri, 23 (shot by police)
Wounded: Debra Lynn Fine, 50 (shot in vehicle); Three unidentified victims (all wounded in bus)

Six people were killed during the incident, including Zawahri, who was shot by police. One shooting victim died from her wounds in the hospital two days later. Four others were injured. The injured victims were treated at Ronald Reagan UCLA Medical Center. The conditions of the wounded victims ranged from critical to good, and at least one underwent surgery.

Zawahri's first victims were his father, 55-year-old Samir Zawahri, and older brother, 24-year-old Christopher Zawahri, both of whom lived in the home at 2036 Yorkshire Avenue in Santa Monica. They were believed to have been shot and killed after the house was set on fire. One of the victims was Debra Lynn Fine, a 50-year-old woman shot as she came upon the Yorkshire Avenue carjacking and attempted to intervene. Three other people went to Ronald Reagan UCLA Medical Center with minor injuries; one had shrapnel-type injuries and the two others had injuries not related to gunfire. All were treated and released.

During the incident, two people were killed near the library at Santa Monica College. One was Margarita Gomez, a 68-year-old woman who was collecting recyclable material, and the other was Carlos Navarro Franco, the 68-year-old groundskeeper for the school and the driver of the Ford Explorer. His 26-year-old daughter and passenger, Marcela Diaz Franco, was wounded and died from her injuries in a hospital two days later.

The Los Angeles County Coroner's Office released the causes of death on June 12. Samir Zawahri was shot multiple times, and Christopher Zawahri was shot once in the chest. Carlos Navarro Franco died of gunshot wounds to the neck and face; his daughter, Marcela Diaz Franco, a student at the college, died of a gunshot wound to the head. Margarita Gomez, the woman who was collecting cans outside the library, died after being shot in the abdomen and chest. Zawahri died of multiple gunshot wounds.

== Aftermath ==
Santa Monica College was placed on lock-down and issued a statement on its Facebook page for students to stay away from the campus. The lock-down was lifted later that day, but the campus grounds remained closed until the following Monday morning, when students were scheduled to take final exams. All schools in the Santa Monica-Malibu Unified School District were placed on lock-down as well. In the days and weeks following the shooting, mental health counseling was provided at Santa Monica College to students, employees, and the surrounding community.

President Barack Obama was in Santa Monica at the time for a fundraiser just a ten-minute drive from the campus. His motorcade was rerouted and he left safely on Air Force One. A report of the shooting released in March 2014 later revealed that the reason behind the quick police response was Obama's presence, which required a large number of police officers and also specialized tactical resources in the area.

On August 7, 2013, exactly two months after the killing spree, the Los Angeles Community College District Board of Trustees adopted a resolution banning firearms on its nine area campuses. The resolution cited "repeated, serious occurrences of campus-based shootings". It also stated "the presence of firearms, even when nonoperational and in the instructional setting, lends itself to the potential for panic and fear". The policy allows weapons on campus only if carried by a sworn law enforcement officer or for use in a theatrical performance. It effectively ended the conduct of non-credit gun safety classes previously offered on LACCD campuses.

== See also ==
- List of homicides in California
- List of school shootings in the United States
- List of school shootings in the United States by death toll
