= New Model Army (disambiguation) =

New Model Army may refer to:

- New Model Army, one of the Parliamentarian armies of the English Civil War
- Douglas Haig's units of the British Expeditionary Force decimated at the Somme in World War I
- New Model Army Revolver, a percussion revolver popular during the American Civil War
- New Model Army (band), a British punk / indie music band founded in the 1980s
