= Colt M1861 Navy =

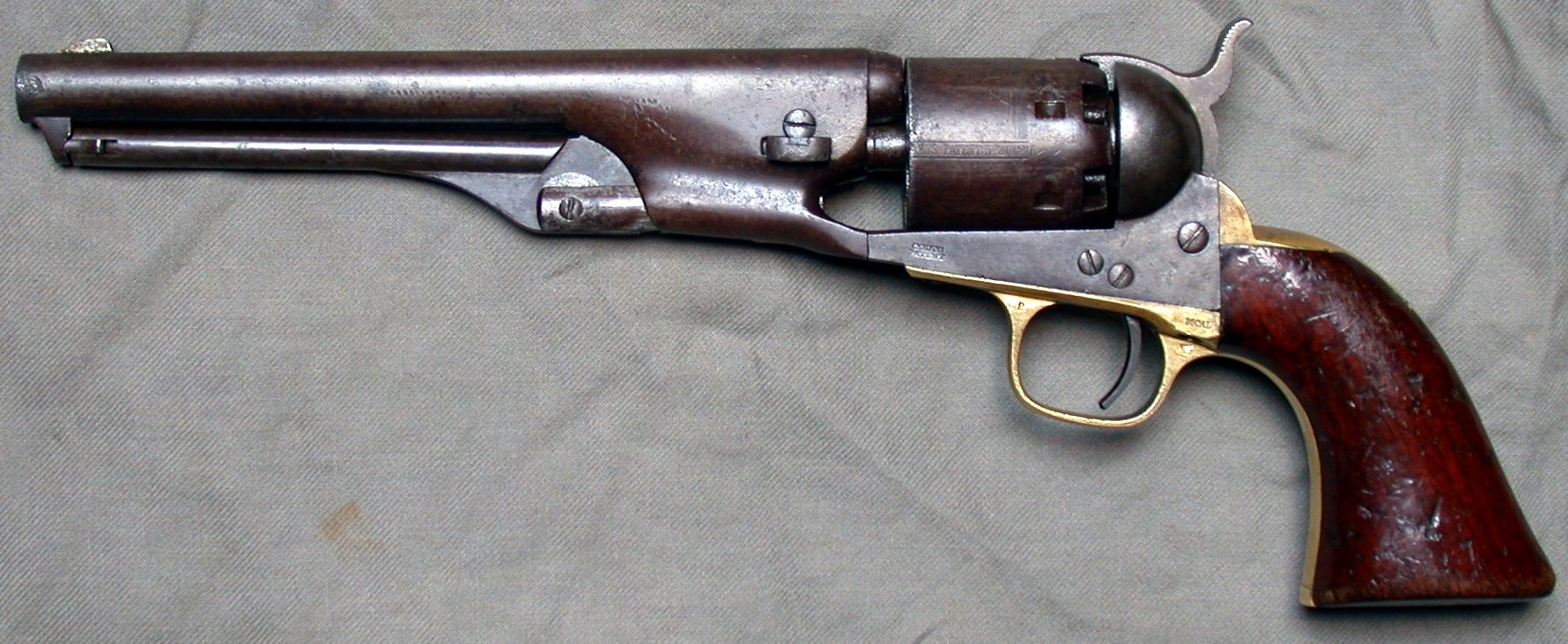
- Colt 1861 Navy Revolver
- Type: Revolver
- Place of origin: United States

Service history
- In service: 1861–1873
- Used by: United States; Confederate States; Native Americans; United Kingdom; Australia; Canada; Empire of Japan
- Wars: American Civil War; American Indian Wars; Boshin War; Satsuma Rebellion; Fenian Raid; Fenian Rising; Red River Rebellion

Production history
- Designer: Samuel Colt
- Manufacturer: Colt's Manufacturing Company
- Produced: 1861-1873
- No. built: 38,000
- Variants: 100 revolvers produced with full fluted cylinders

Specifications
- Mass: 42 oz (1,200 g)
- Length: 13 inches (330 mm)
- Barrel length: 7.5 inches (190 mm)
- Cartridge: Paper-wrapped .36 caliber; .38 Short Colt (conversions)
- Caliber: 0.36
- Action: Single-action
- Muzzle velocity: 850 to 1,000 ft/s depending upon load
- Feed system: 6 round cylinder

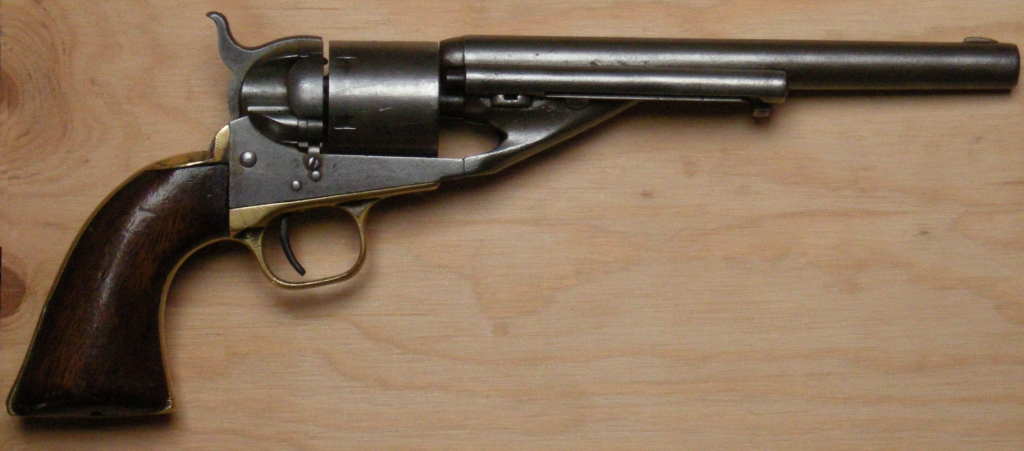
Colt Navy 1861 Conversion

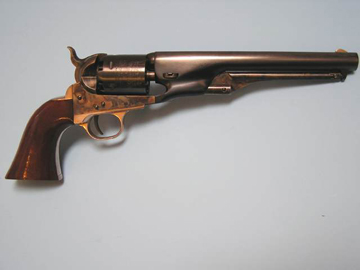
1861 Navy, second generation

The Colt Model 1861 Navy cap & ball .36-caliber revolver is a six-shot, single-action percussion weapon that was produced by Colt's Manufacturing Company from 1861 until 1873. It incorporates the "creeping" or ratchet loading lever and round barrel of the .44-caliber Army Model of 1860 but has a barrel one-half inch (13 mm) shorter, at 7.5 inches (190 mm). Total production was 38,000 revolvers.

== History ==
Like its forerunner, the Colt 1851 Navy Revolver, it saw widespread use in the American Civil War and on the American Western frontier, though far fewer were produced. It has the same general specification as the earlier model, but with a rounded barrel and somewhat different rammer. While similar in design to the Colt Army Model 1860, the lighter recoil of the 1861 Navy's .36 caliber was preferred by some cavalry soldiers.

During the Civil War its main competitor in England was the Adams self-cocking revolver. The Adams fired a .49 caliber bullet and did not require the shooter to pull the hammer back. Colt's revolver was more popular because Colt mass-produced his weapons while Adams' products were handmade by skilled artisans. In the United States, Colt's main rival was the Remington Model 1858 revolver.

== Characteristics ==
There were few variations of the Model 1861 Navy Colt. Approximately 100 of the first guns made had fluted cylinders with no cylinder scene. Another 100, made between the serial ranges of 11,000 and 14,000 were cut for a shoulder stock – the lower portion of the recoil shield was milled away and a fourth screw for the stock was added to the frame. With the exception of the first fifty or so of this model, all guns had a capping groove. A brass trigger guard and back strap, silver-plated, were standard. The cylinders of the Navy 1851 and 1861 Navy Colt revolvers are engraved with a scene of the victory of the Second Texas Navy at the Battle of Campeche on May 16, 1843. The engraving was provided by Waterman Ormsby.

The Colt 1861 Navy typically was used with paper cartridges, that is, with a cartridge consisting of nitrated paper, a pre-measured black powder charge, and a bullet that was either a lead round ball or a lead conical bullet. The nitrated paper of the cartridge was completely consumed upon use, and the use of paper cartridges enabled faster re-loading. Alternatively, it was always possible to load with measured powder charges and lead round balls.

== Colt 1861 Navy Conversions ==
After the expiration of the Rollin White Patent (Apr. 3, 1869), a number of Navy 1861 and its forerunner, the Colt 1851 Navy Revolver were converted or newly made to fire .38 rimfire or centerfire cartridges, the Colt Model 1861 Richards- Mason Conversion by the Colt factory.
