= .44 Remington Centerfire =

Revolver cartridge

.44 Remington
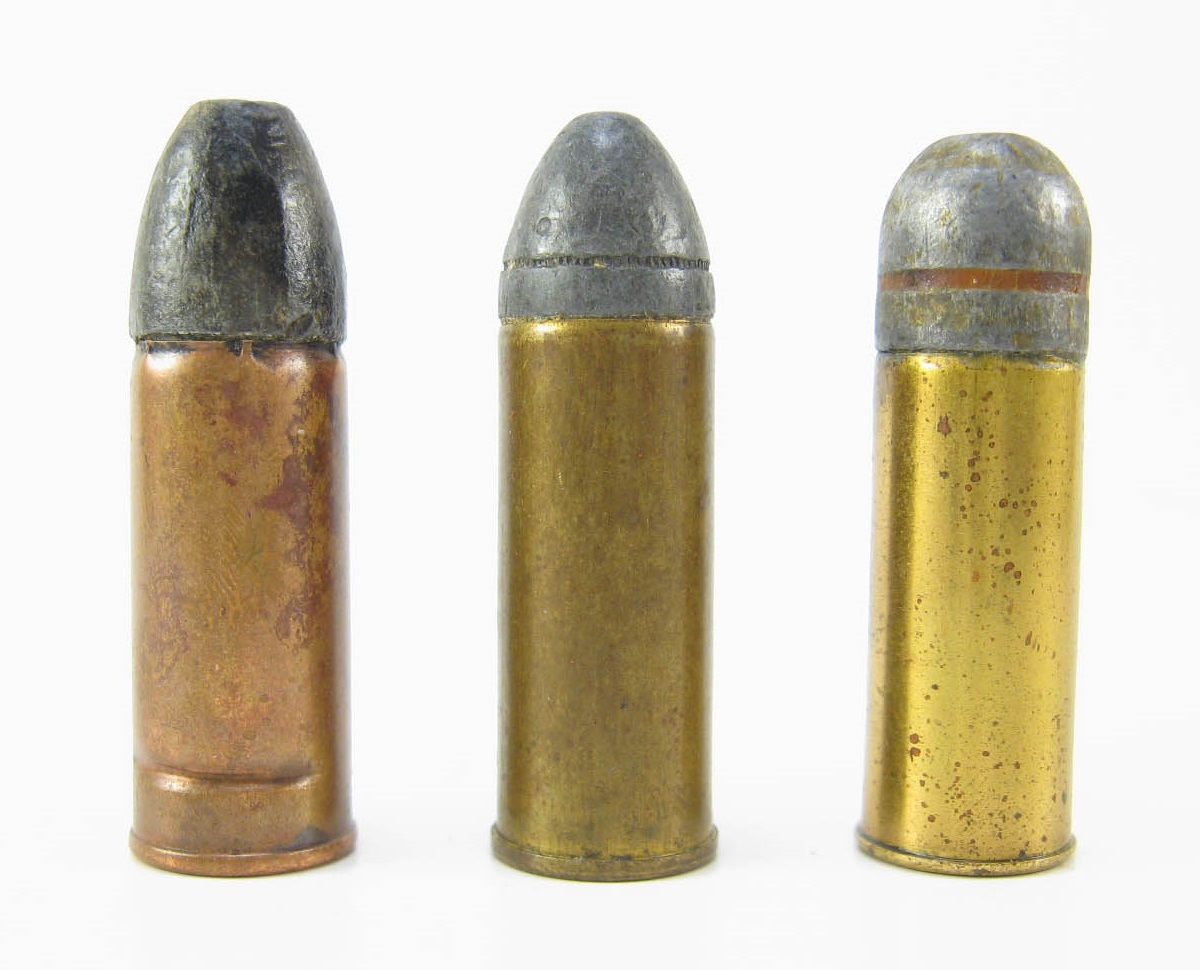
- Left to right - Benet primed .44 Colt & Remington, .44 Colt, and .44 Remington.
- Type: Revolver
- Place of origin: United States

Production history
- Designer: Remington
- Designed: 1874
- Manufacturer: Remington
- Produced: 1875–1895

Specifications
- Case type: Rimmed, straight
- Bullet diameter: 0.447 in (11.4 mm)
- Neck diameter: 0.447 in (11.4 mm)
- Base diameter: 0.448 in (11.4 mm)
- Rim diameter: 0.480 in (12.2 mm)
- Case length: 1.065 in (27.1 mm)
- Case capacity: 40 gr H_{2}O (2.6 cm^{3})
- Primer type: Large pistol

The .44 Remington Centerfire / 11.4x27mmR (often referred to as .44 Remington C.F. or .44 Remington) was a centerfire revolver cartridge with a heeled, externally lubricated bullet produced by the Remington Arms Company from 1875 until 1895. Remington's model 14 (1/2) and the Remington model 1875, were chambered for this cartridge.

== History ==
Remington introduced its first large-calibre centre-fire revolver in 1875, although many Model 1858 percussion revolvers had been converted to .44 Rimfire or .46 Rimfire cartridges, the latter with five-shot cylinders. The new Remington Model 1875 was initially produced in a cartridge of the company's own design, the .44 Remington Centerfire. The first customer for the new revolver was the Egyptian government, which ordered 10,000 of them. However, due to Egypt's failure to pay for an earlier order of Remington Rolling Block rifles, the order was never delivered. Remington apparently sold the revolvers on the open market to recoup its expenses.

Later examples of the Remington Model 1875 were chambered in .44-40 Winchester and .45 Colt calibres, and production of the .44 Remington Centerfire ended in 1895.

== Technical background ==
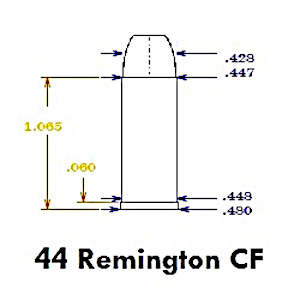

Information about the .44 Remington Centerfire cartridge is rather scarce, with even firearms cartridge encyclopedias failing to mention it. Some sources claim that the cartridge was very close in dimensions and ballistics to the contemporary .44 Colt, to the point of the two being interchangeable, but others dispute this (see below for more information on the dimensions of the two cartridges). The .44 Remington Centerfire may also be confused with the .44-40 Winchester, due to the former habit of some US firearms companies of producing identical copies of their rivals' proprietary cartridges under their own designations.

The .44 Remington Centerfire and .44 Special or .44 Remington Magnum are not the same cartridge.

Case dimensions for the .44 Remington are: 0.480" rim diameter, 0.448" base diameter, 1.065" length. The cartridge contained a 0.447" diameter heeled bullet over 32 grains of black powder.

The .44 Colt cartridge has a 0.456" base diameter, slightly wider than the .44 Remington, and this prevents it from being fully inserted into a .44 Remington chamber.

== See also ==
- List of rimmed cartridges
