= List of weapons of the Philippine Revolution =

This is the list of the weapons used in the Philippine revolution.

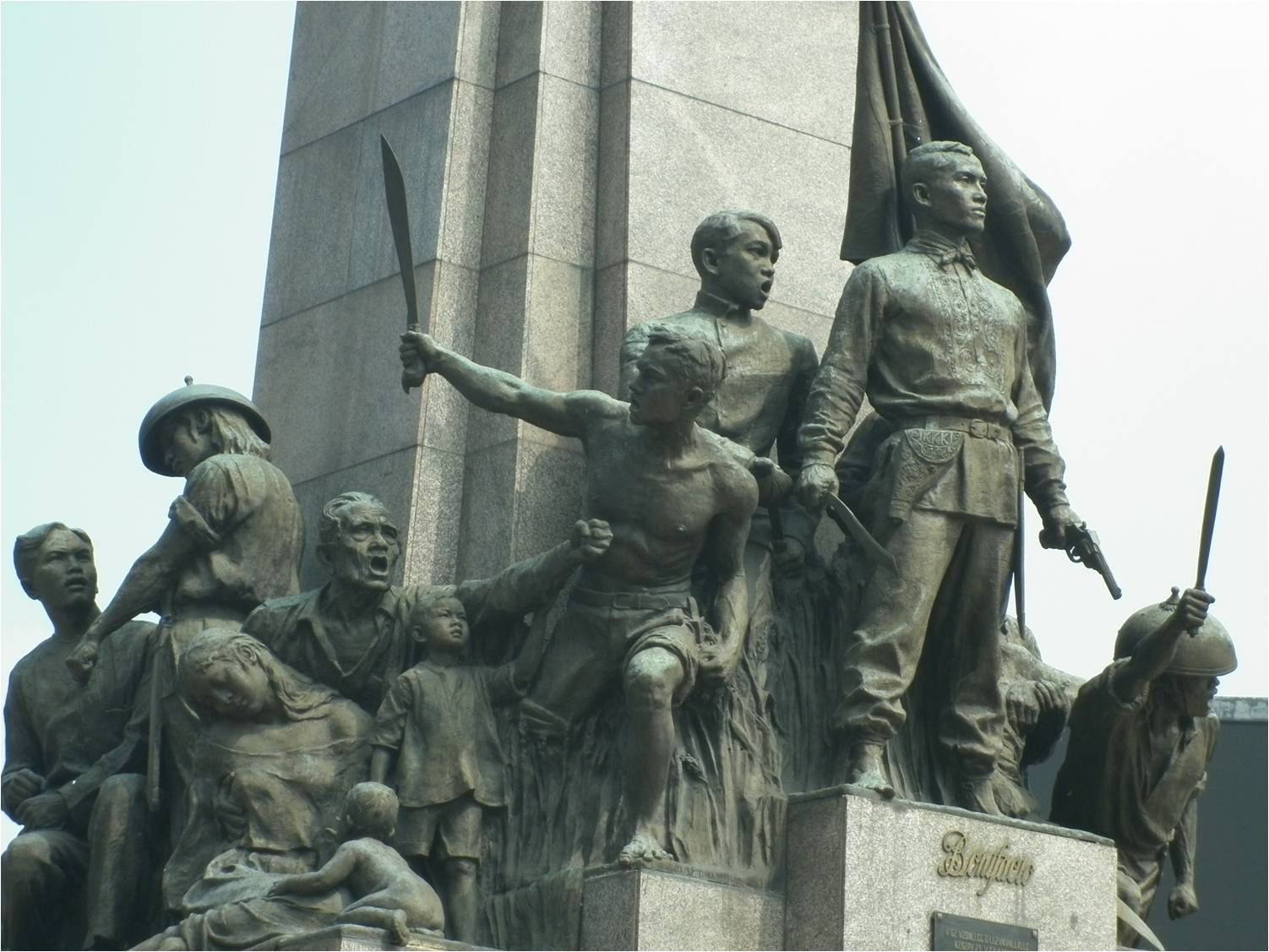
The Bonifacio Monument in Caloocan depicting the Katipunan and the Philippine Revolution

== Background ==
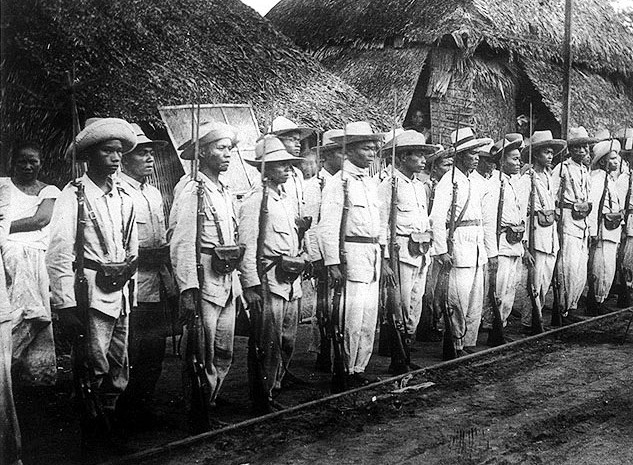
Regular soldiers of the Philippine Revolutionary Army stand attention for an inspection.

The Philippine Revolution, also called the Tagalog War by the Spaniards, was a revolution and subsequent conflict fought between the Katipunan, later the Philippine Revolutionary Army, and the Spanish colonial government.

Orders and circulars were issued covering matters such as building trenches and fortifications, equipping every male aged 15 to 50 with bows and arrows (as well as bolo knives and goloks, though officers wielded European swords), enticing Filipino soldiers in the Spanish colonial army to defect, collecting empty cartridges for refilling, prohibiting unplanned sorties, inventories of captured arms and ammunition, fundraising, purchasing of arms and supplies abroad, unification of military commands, and exhorting the rich to provide aid to the soldiers.

== List of equipment ==
=== Spanish colonial government ===
These are the weapons used by the Guardia Civil, and the Spanish Army.

==== Handguns ====
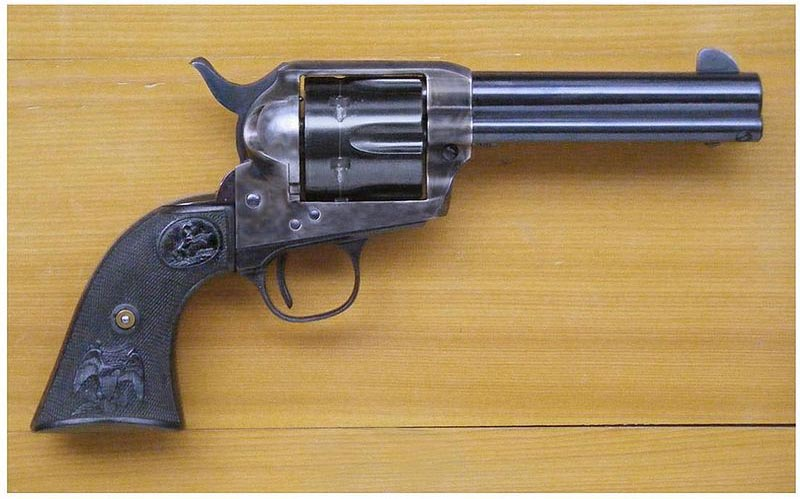
Revolvers were used by officers of both sides.

- Revolver
- Mauser C96
- Mauser Zig-Zag

==== Rifles ====
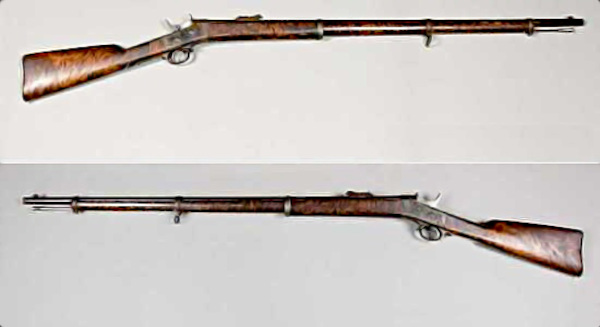
The Remington Rolling Block rifle was one of the first rifles used by the Filipinos and Spaniards during the revolution.

- Spanish M93 – standard rifle, primarily used by Guardia Civil
- Remington Rolling Block rifle – used by Guardia Civil
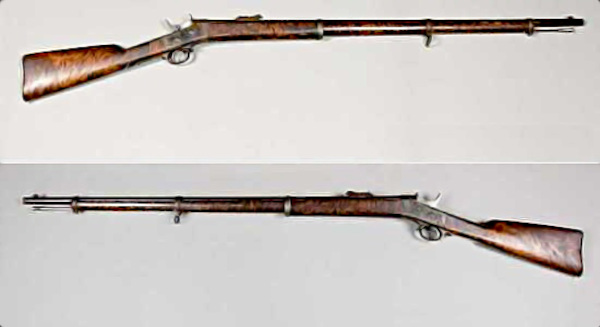
The Spanish Remington

==== Machine guns ====
- Nordenfelt guns

==== Artillery ====
- Krupp gun
- Ordóñez guns – Spanish coast guard
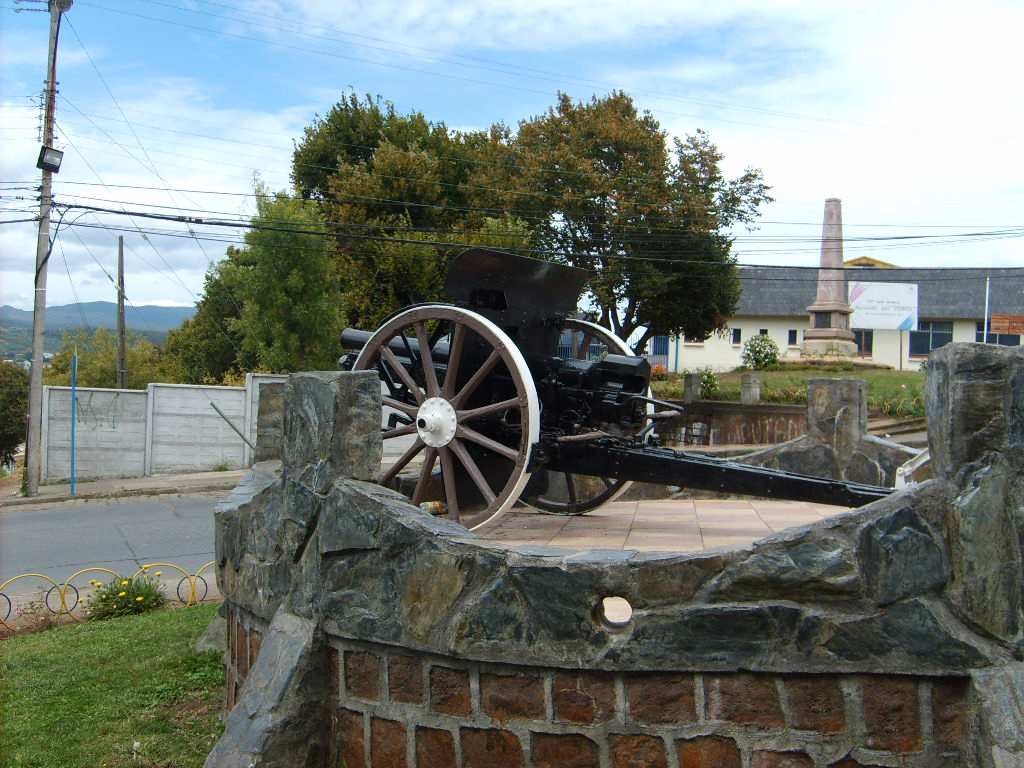
Krupp guns were used by the artillery regiments.

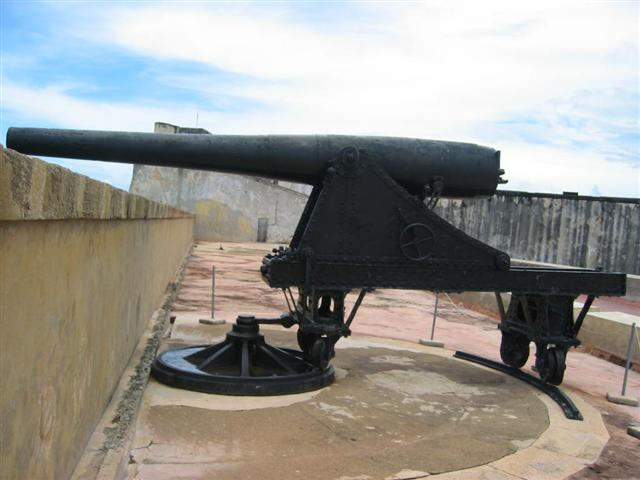
An Ordóñez gun used by the coast guard

==== Other weapons ====
- Sabers – used by officers in the battlefield
- Bayonets
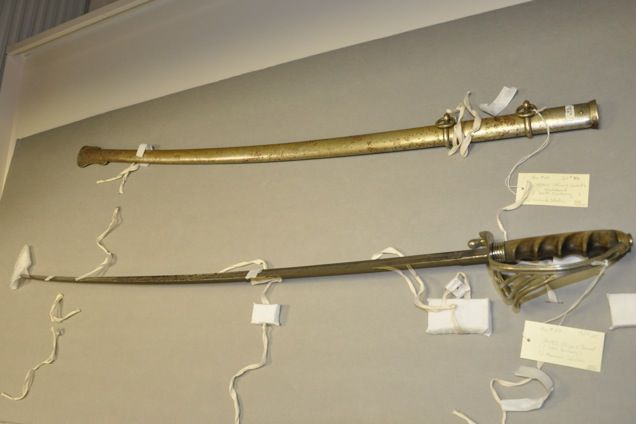
Sabers were issued to Spanish army officers.
- These are the weapons that used by the early and late Katipunan, and the Philippine Revolutionary Army from infantry, Tiradores, cavalry, artillery, sappers: and even Muslim Filipinos.

==== Handguns ====
- Revolver
- Mauser C96
- Lefaucheux Model 1863 - The Philippine revolutionary capture from Spain

==== Rifles ====
- Mauser Model 1893 - Standard rifle for Philippine Republican Army in 1899.
- Remington Rolling Block rifle - Standard rifle of the Philippine Revolutionary Army in 1896-1898.
- Mosin Nagant - Used Philippine Revolutionary Army in 1896-1898.
- Muskets - Used in the opening battles of 1896.

==== Machine guns ====
- Nordenfelt guns captured from the Spaniards
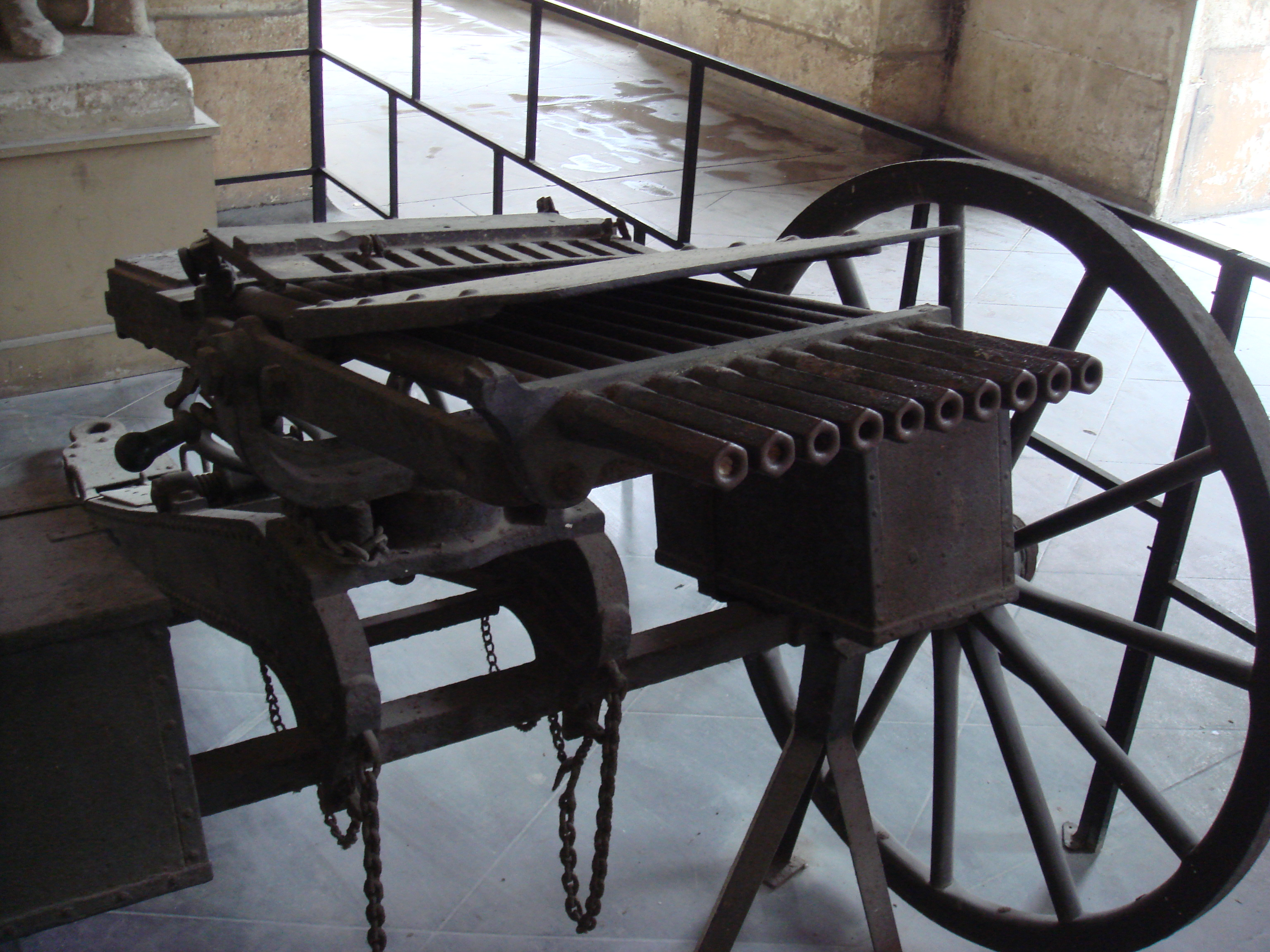
A Nordenfelt machine gun in display.

==== Artillery ====
- Krupp gun
- Ordóñez guns
- Lantakas – used by local villagers and especially in Mindanao.
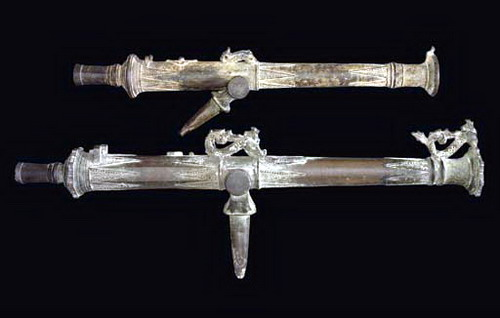
Two types of lantaka, a bronze-type cannon used by the army

==== Other weapons ====
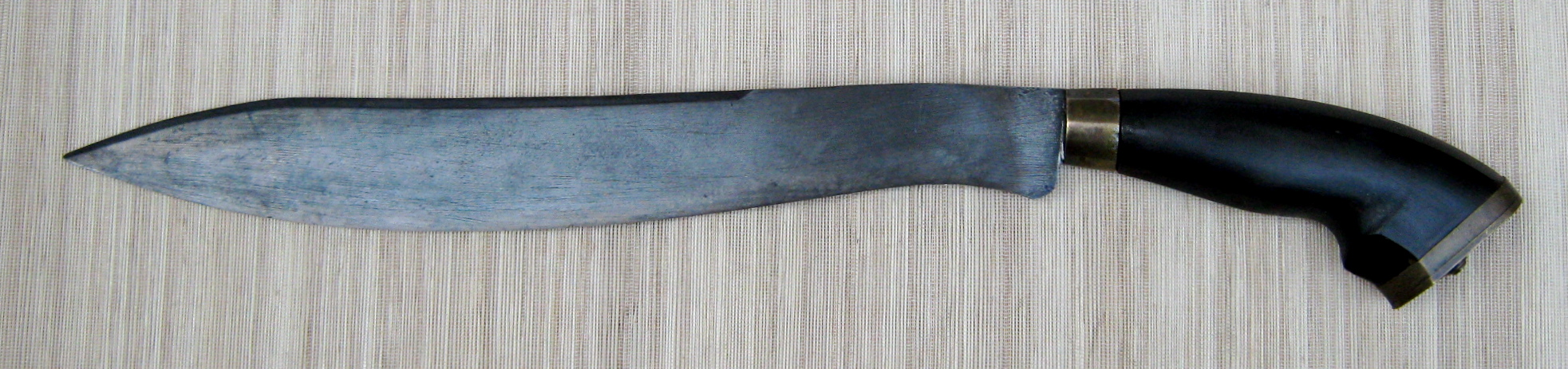
A bolo knife

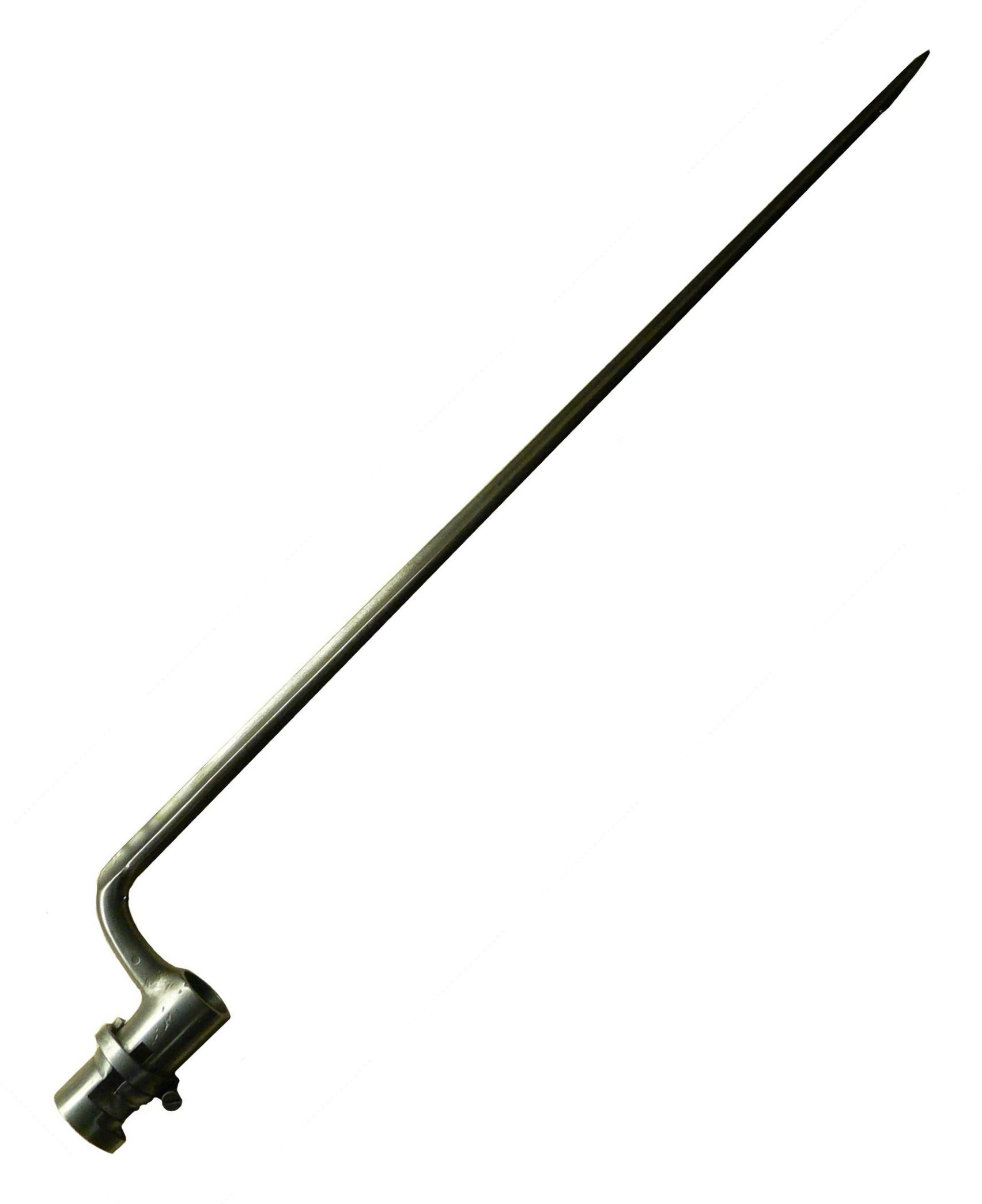
Spike bayonets were used by both sides during the revolution although Filipinos only captured them from the Spanish or acquired them through defectors

- Bolo knife – standard handheld weapon of the Katipunero militias, also known in Tagalog as iták, Cebuano as súndang, Ilocano as bunéng and Hiligaynon as binangon
- Bows
- Kalis – used by the Moro people in Mindanao
- Musket – Also used by the Moro people in Mindanao
- Sibat
- Balisong
- Golok – a primary sword for enlisted officers
- Barong knife
- Spike bayonet
- Dahong palay
- Kampilan
- Parang – used primarily in Visayas and Mindanao
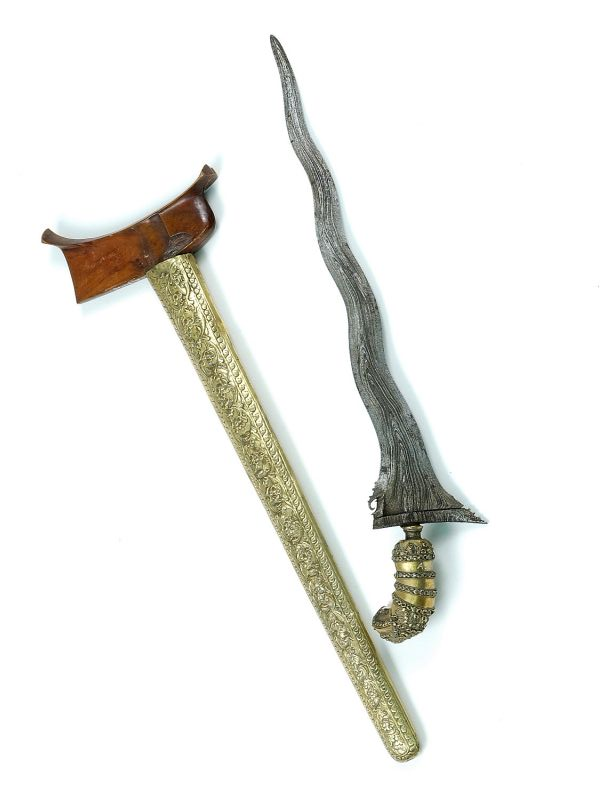
Kris or kalis had been used in the revolution by the Moros of Mindanao.

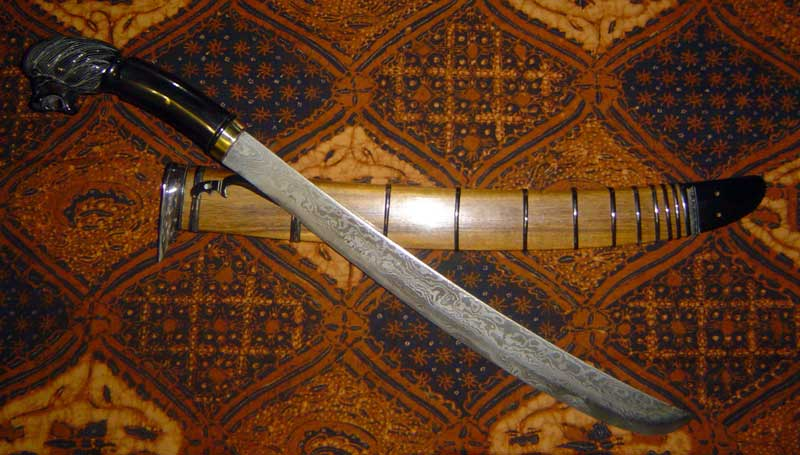
The gulok used as a primary saber of enlisted officers

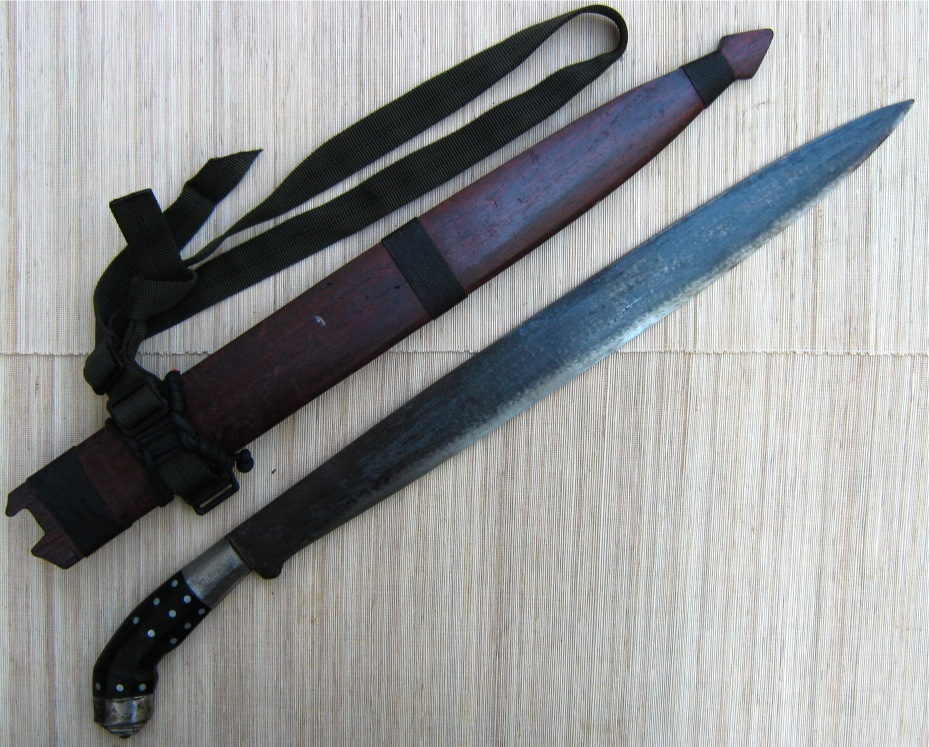
The dahong palay used by local militias

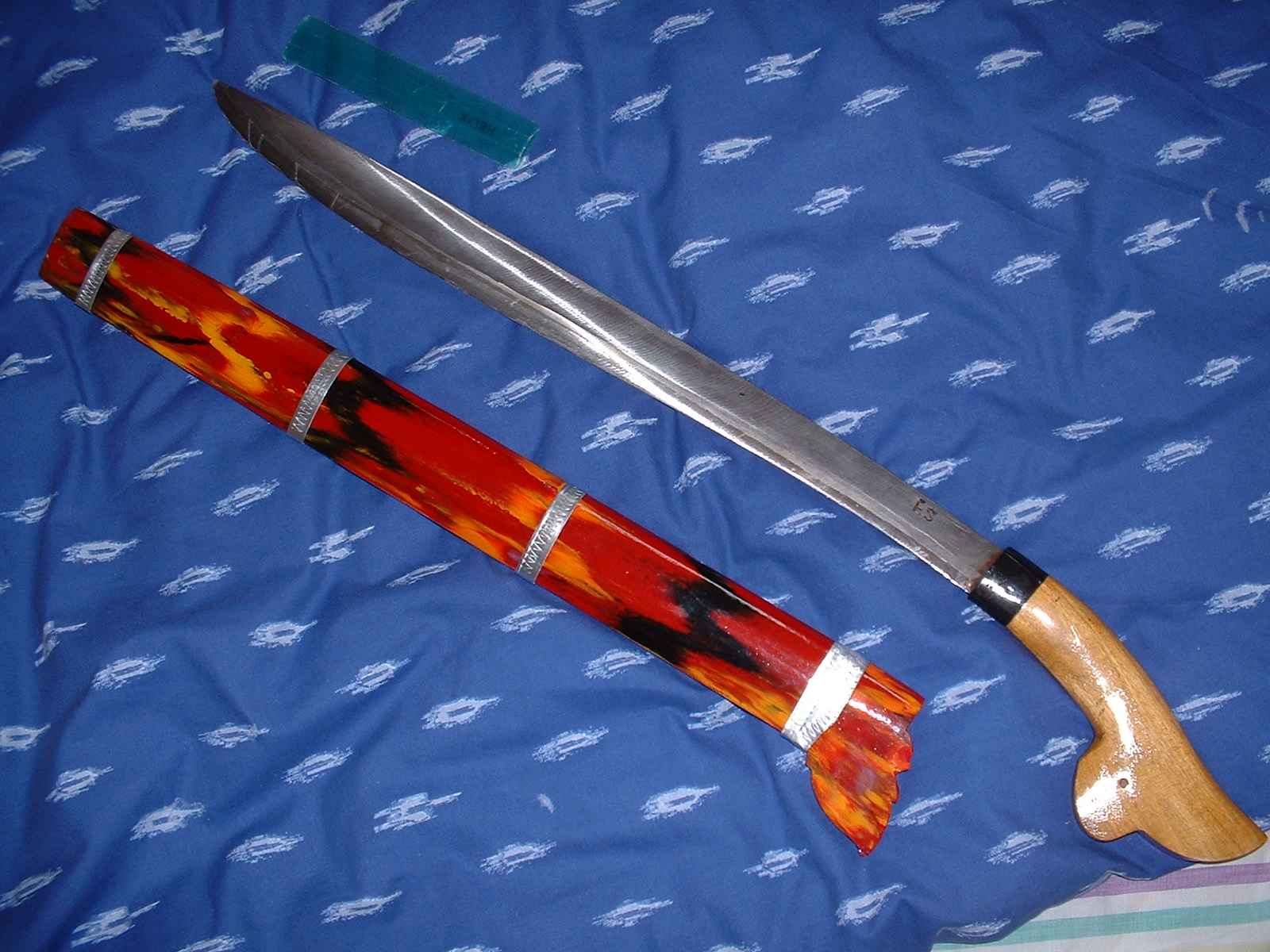
The parang knife

== Other information ==
- The Bolo knife was the primary weapon used by the Katipunan during the Philippine Revolution. It was also used by the Filipino guerrillas and bolomen during the Philippine–American War. the bolo serves as a symbol for the Katipunan and the Philippine Revolution, particularly the Cry of Pugad Lawin. Several monuments of Andres Bonifacio, as with other notable Katipuneros, depict him holding a bolo in one hand and the Katipunan flag in the other.
- The Filipino forces sometimes used improvised artillery weapons made of water pipes reinforced with bamboo or timber, which can only fire once or twice.
- During the 1896 uprising against Spanish colonial rule the 1898 Philippine Revolution and the Spanish–American War, Filipino freedom fighters (especially the Katipunan) sought assistance from the Japanese government. The Katipunan sent a delegate to the Emperor of Japan to solicit funds and military arms in May 1896. Although the Meiji government of Japan was unwilling and unable to provide any official support, Japanese supporters of Philippine independence in the Pan-Asian movement raised funds and sent weapons on the privately charted Nunobiki Maru unfortunately, the ship sank before it reach to Philippine shores.

== See also ==
- Philippine Revolutionary Army
- Katipunan
- Philippine Revolution
- Guardia Civil
- Warfare in pre-colonial Philippines
- Military history of the Philippines
- List of weapons of the Spanish–American War
