= Colt Army Model 1860 =

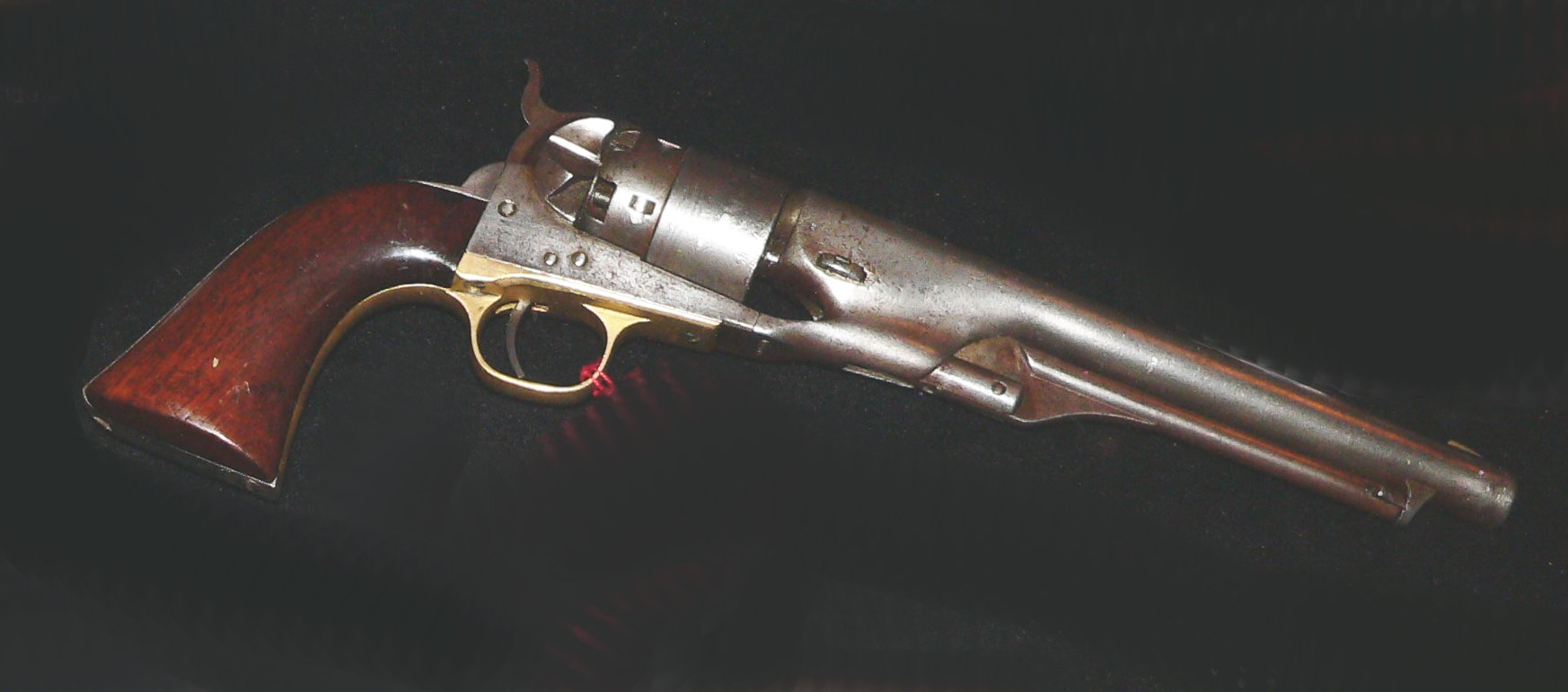
- Colt Army Model 1860
- Type: Revolver
- Place of origin: United States

Service history
- In service: 1860–1873
- Used by: United States; Confederate States; Native Americans; United Kingdom; Canada; Australia; Empire of Japan; Empire of Brazil
- Wars: American Civil War; American Indian Wars; Boshin War; Fenian raid Red River Rebellion

Production history
- Designer: Samuel Colt
- Manufacturer: Colt's Manufacturing Company
- Produced: 1860 to 1873
- No. built: 200,000+

Specifications
- Mass: 2 lb, 11 oz (1.22 kg)
- Length: 14 in (355.6 mm)
- Barrel length: 8 in (203.2 mm)
- Height: 5.25 in (133.35 mm)
- Cartridge: Paper-wrapped .44 caliber round and conical ball (paper cartridge), .44 Colt (conversions)
- Caliber: .44
- Action: Single-action
- Muzzle velocity: 550–1000 ft/s (167.6–304.8 m/s)
- Effective firing range: 50–75 yds (45.7–68.6 m)
- Feed system: 6 round cylinder

The Colt Army Model 1860 is a cap & ball .44-caliber single-action revolver used during the American Civil War made by Colt's Manufacturing Company. It was used as a side arm by cavalry, infantry, artillery troops, and naval forces.

== History ==
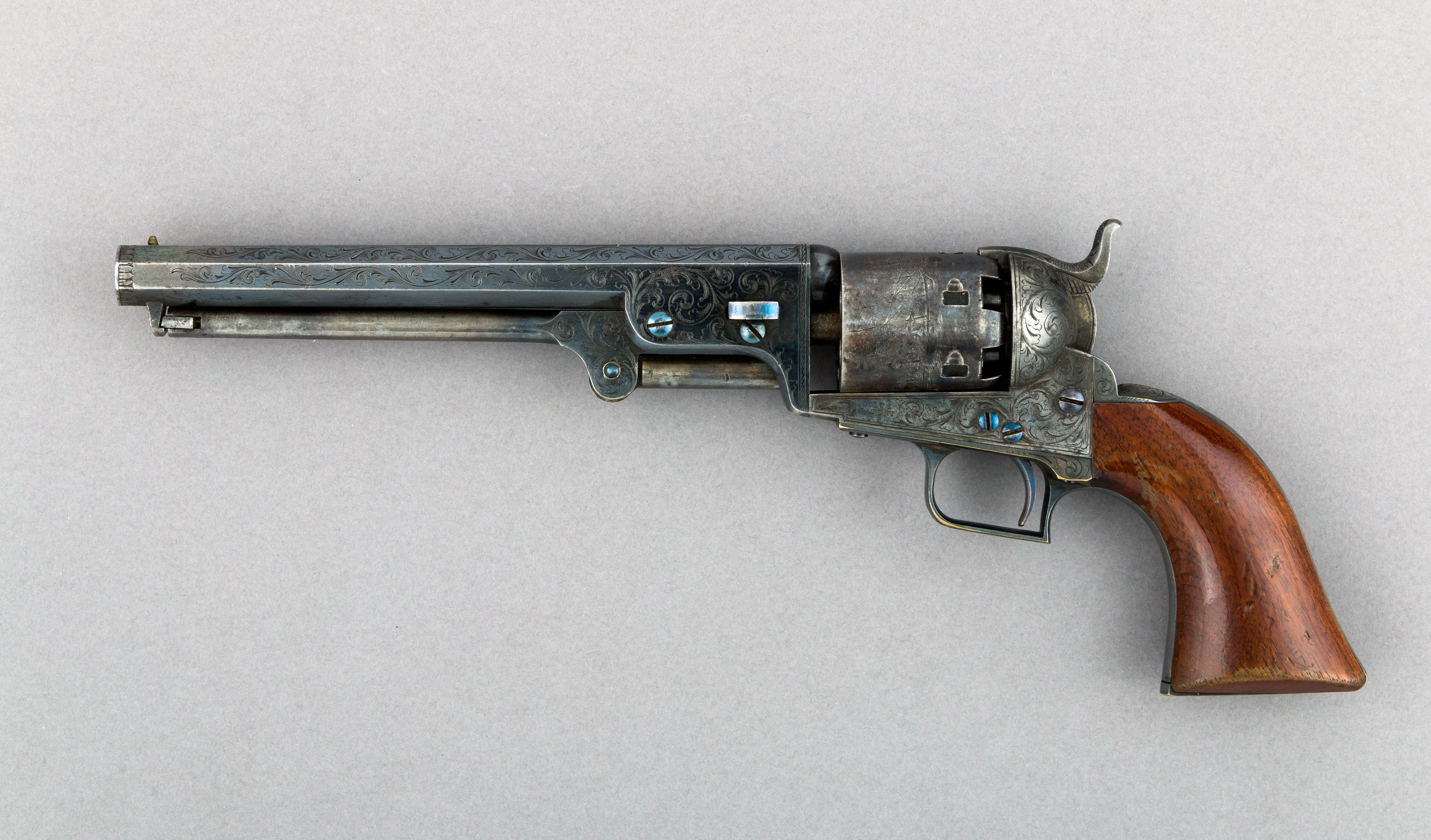
the Army Model 1860 shares its frame with the Colt Navy Model 1851

The Colt 1860 Army uses the same size frame as the .36 caliber 1851 Navy revolver. The frame is relieved to allow the use of a rebated cylinder that enables the Army to be chambered in .44 caliber. The barrel on the 1860 Army has a forcing cone that is visibly shorter than that of the 1851 Navy, allowing the Army revolver to have a longer cylinder. Another distinguishing feature of the Colt 1860 Army, first introduced on the Colt 1855 Sidehammer Revolver, is the "creeping" loading lever.

More than 200,000 were manufactured from 1860 through 1873. Colt's biggest customer was the US Government with no fewer than 129,730 units being purchased and issued to the troops. The firearm was a single-action, six-shot revolver accurate from 75 up to 100 yards, where the fixed sights were typically set when manufactured. The rear sight was a notch in the hammer, only usable when the revolver was fully cocked.

The Colt .44-caliber “Army" Model was the most widely used revolver of the Civil War. It had a six-shot, rotating cylinder, and fired a 0.454-inch-diameter (11.5 mm) round spherical lead ball, or a conical-tipped bullet, typically propelled by a 30-grain charge of black powder, which was ignited by a small copper percussion cap that contained a volatile charge of fulminate of mercury (a substance that explodes upon being subjected to a sharp impact). The percussion cap, when struck by the hammer, ignited the powder charge. When fired, balls had a muzzle velocity of about 900 feet per second (274 meters/second), although this depended on how much powder it was loaded with.

The unfluted cylinder was "rebated", meaning that the rear of the cylinder was turned to a smaller diameter than the front. The barrel was rounded and smoothed into the frame, as was the 1861 Navy Model. The frame, hammer, and rammer lever were case-hardened, the remainder blued; grips were of one-piece walnut; and the trigger guard and front grip strap were of brass while the backstrap was blued."

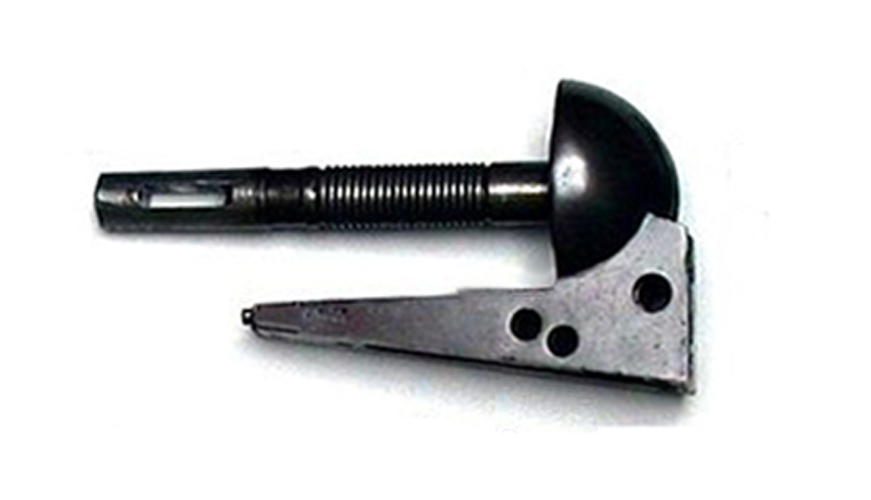
Colt Army '60 cylinder pin

A distinguishing feature of the Model 1860 was that its frame had no top strap, or no component running above the cylinder. Instead, its strength came from the lower frame and the massive fixed cylinder pin. This made the gun slimmer and lighter than its main competitor, the Remington Model 1858, but the fixed cylinder pin meant that the barrel had to be removed to remove the cylinder, unlike the Model 1858, which only required removal of the cylinder retaining pin.

By April 1861, 2,230 of Colt's earliest production went to dealers south of the Mason–Dixon line. The United States Navy ordered 900 fluted cylinder revolvers in May 1861 later issued to ships enforcing the Atlantic and Gulf blockade. United States Army orders also began in May, with a total of 127,157 being delivered. The Colt 1860 would be the most prolifically used revolver by union forces throughout the civil war. At the time many cavalry forces saw the revolver as the primary arm for horse mounted action, and during the early war years many cavalry units would go into combat armed only with a saber and a Colt 1860. Eventually the 1860s were replaced by the Remington Model 1858 due to Remington’s cheaper price and the ability to easily reload by swapping cylinders without having to remove the whole barrel, as was the case for the Colt. The last government contracted Colts were delivered in November 1863. But even with this early end of production the model 1860 would remain the most popular sidearm with union forces. The revolver would continue to see service after the war and all the way up to the adoption of the Colt single action army.

During the early years of the Plains wars the 1860s saw service with many different cavalry units. While considered outdated, the lack of funds for the military led to these revolvers being retained with many units. The army was aware that front loading revolvers were out of date, and trials would soon begin to find a proper substitute. As a stopgap measure during the late 1860s and early 1870s many Model 1860s would also be converted to fire the new .44 Colt metallic cartridges. About 1000 of these conversions came from the Colt factory and were considered relatively high quality. But many other conversions were made by local gunsmiths and varied wildly in quality with many done in a haphazard fashion. As such these conversions saw mixed results in service, with a general reported decrease in the overall reliability of the revolvers. Some of these conversions were found lacking basic features such as cartridge extractors, making them very difficult to use.

== Variations ==
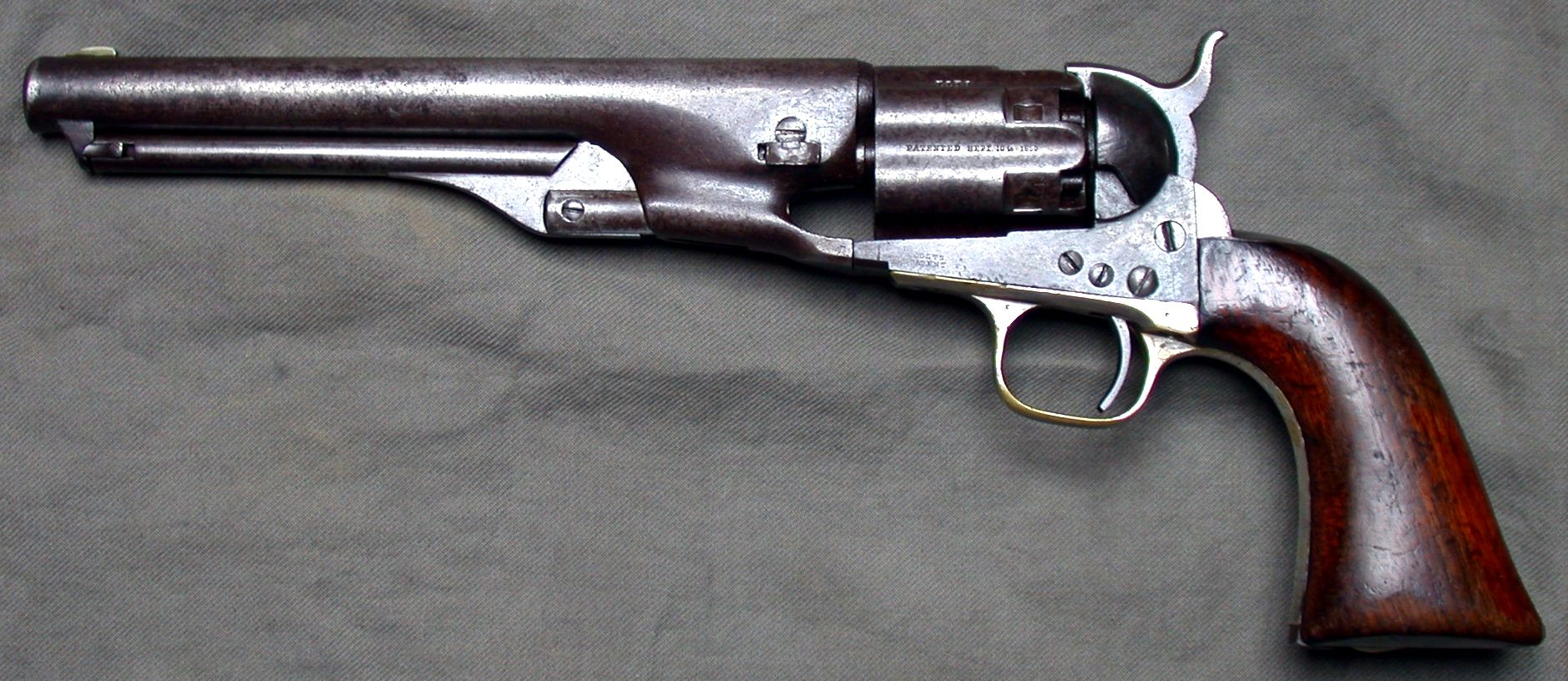
Army 1860 7.5-inch barrel serial no. 1158

There are very few variations on the 1860 Army Revolver, but there was limited production of a 7.5-inch barrel model below serial number 3500, and a lightened model with cylinder flutes below serial number 8000. According to importer Cimarron Arms Company, this was called the "Texas Model" because a number of them came into Texas shortly after secession. The goal was to make use of silver spring steel of controlled carbon content and greater strength, but the thinned cylinder proved inadequate and sometimes exploded.(ibid Wilson) Patent inscription in cylinder flute: PATENTED SEPT. 10th 1850. Rebated cylinders above serial number 8000 were roller indented with a Texas Navy and Mexican battle scene and stamped with COLT PATENT NO followed by the last four digits of the serial number.

Military 1860s had elongated screw lugs on the side of the frame to mount a detachable shoulder stock. Some shoulder stocks were also hollow on the inside and intended to be used as canteens and were, unsurprisingly, called "canteen stocks". Stocks were typically made of wood, but other materials were also used, such as, in rare examples, pewter.

A further variant was created after the Civil War that tried to incorporate metallic cartridges while the army searched for an updated sidearm. This conversion was done in limited numbers at the Colt factory in an attempt to update the army's arsenal at a limited cost. The revolvers had their frame and cylinder modified as while being equipped with a loading gate. This conversion allowed the revolvers to accept the new .44 Colt metallic cartridge. These conversions saw limited use and were generally seen as much less reliable when compared to other metallic cartridge revolvers of the time.

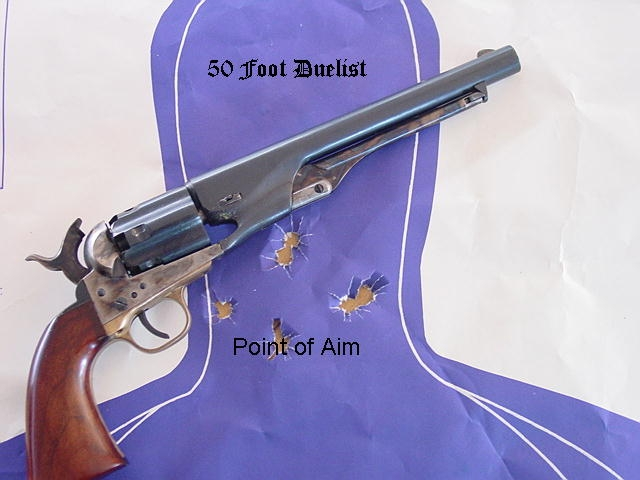
Model with cylinder flutes

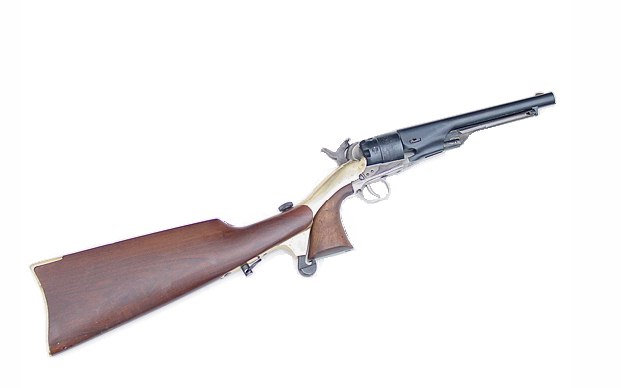
Model stock mounted

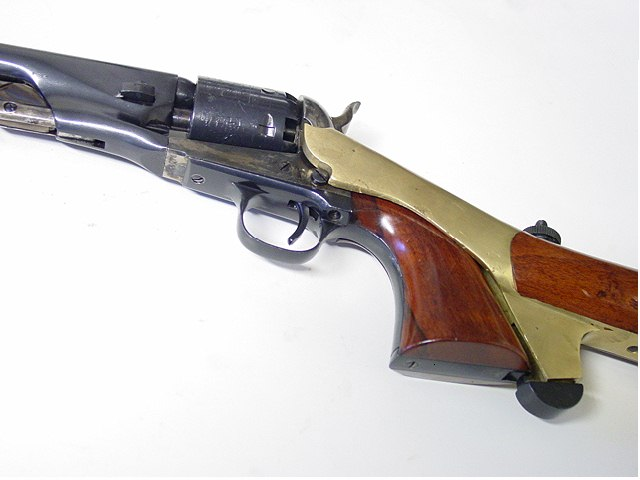
Shoulder stock mount and lugs

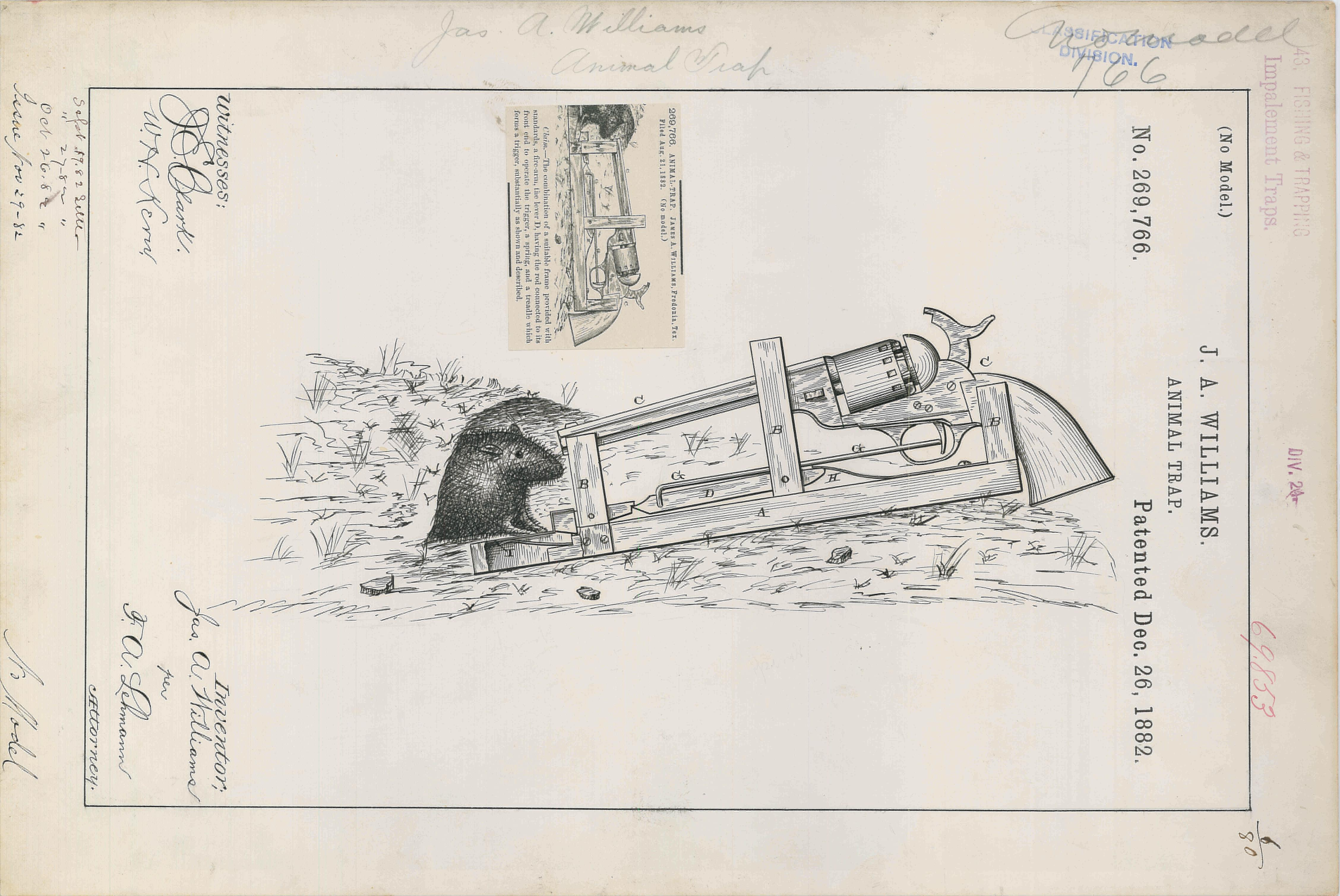
patented use of surplus revolver

== Operation ==
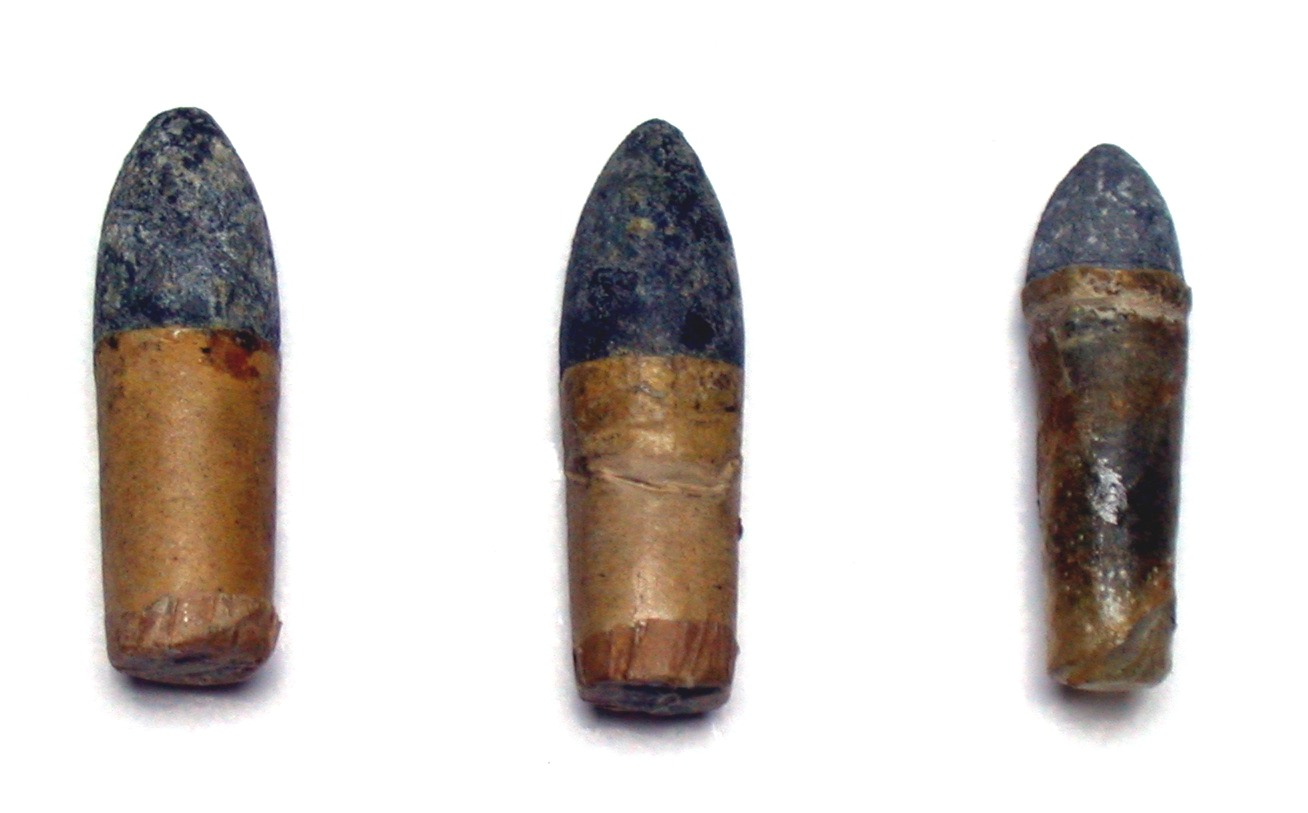
.44 and .36 paper cartridges

Loading is a somewhat lengthy process, with each of the six chambers drilled into the revolving cylinder being loaded from the front of the cylinder. A measured amount of black powder is poured into each chamber. Next a lead ball, or conical bullet (as pictured to the right), is placed at the opening of the chamber and seated by firmly pressing it in with the pivoting loading lever which is attached beneath the barrel of the revolver. For sealing each chamber, an oversize 0.454-inch-diameter (11.5 mm) lead ball is trimmed slightly by the rim of the chamber as the rammer forces it inside. Cap and ball shooters also often place a lubricated wad between balls and powder, or, alternatively, pack lard or a commercially-sold bore lubricant at the mouth of each chamber in an attempt to prevent powder in an adjacent chamber from being ignited by when the gun is fired, which is known as a chainfire. To complete the loading process a percussion cap (described above) is placed on the 'nipple' located on the rear end of each chamber of the cylinder.

When the Colt Model 1860 was used by 19th century soldiers, they most often loaded the gun using paper cartridges. These cartridges consisted of a pre-measured load of black powder and a ball, or conical bullet, wrapped at its base in nitrated paper (paper that had been soaked in potassium nitrate and then dried, to make it more flammable). Loading was thereby simplified to a degree as one only had to slip the premade paper cartridge into the front of the chamber, then seat the protruding conical bullet with the loading lever ram, and finally afix the percussion cap.

The Colt 1860 cost approximately $20 per revolver. This was rather expensive during the 1860s, both for the United States Army and private citizens. Colt had been criticized for this high price, and by 1865 the revolver was reduced to $14.50 ($305.00 in 2025).

The Colt "Army" revolver is to be distinguished from the Colt "Navy" revolver of which there were two models, the octagonal barrel Model 1851 Navy, and the round-barreled Model 1861 Navy, both Navy models being in the smaller .36-caliber. Replica Navy revolvers sold today are often sold in the historically incorrect .44-caliber; originally, all Navy revolvers were manufactured only in .36-caliber.
