= Remington Model 1890 =

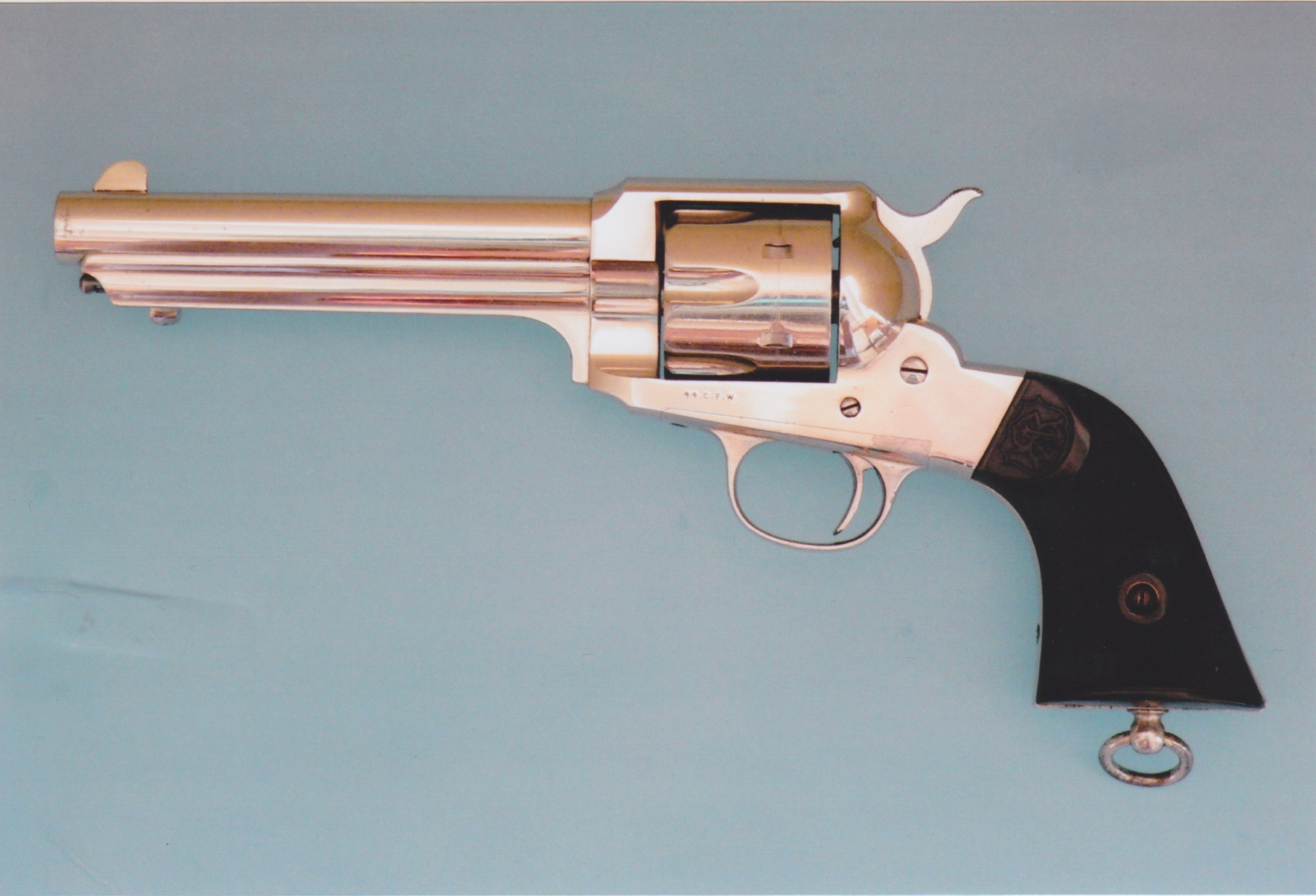
- Type: Revolver
- Place of origin: United States

Production history
- Manufacturer: Remington Arms
- Unit cost: US$10.70
- Produced: 1890–1896
- No. built: 2,020
- Variants: blued or nickel finish

Specifications
- Barrel length: 5 3/4 or 7 1/2 inches (150 or 190 mm)
- Cartridge: .44-40 Winchester only
- Action: Single-action
- Maximum firing range: 50 meters
- Feed system: 6-shot Cylinder
- Sights: Milled groove in the rear of the top-strap, Front blade.

The Remington Model 1890 New Model Army was a revolver by Remington Arms. It was based on the successful Remington Model 1875 and the lesser known Model 1888 with both revolvers having the same size, appearance, and the removable cylinder. The 1890 Remington single-actions kept the solid frame and similar styling of the 1875 model, but lacking the large web under the ejector rod housing and equipped with checkered rubber grips. Like the 1875 model, the 1890 was suitably made for metallic cartridges, but only issued in .44-40 caliber.

== Overview ==
Remington entered the cartridge revolver market in 1875 when it introduced a big-frame, army-style revolver, a six-shooter to compete with the Colt Peacemaker. Ordinary citizens and Old West lawmen alike recognized the sturdy quality of the new Remington revolvers. Changes made to the 1890 were an attempt to make it more similar to the competing Colt single-action pistols of the era.

After the production of a few Model 1888 transition revolvers with 5 3/4-inch barrel, called the "New Model Pocket Army", Remington began production of the Model 1890 Single Action Army revolver. It was manufactured between 1890 and 1896 in very small numbers. It is one of the most sought-after of Remington handguns. Standard barrel length was 7 1/2 inches or 5 3/4 inches. Of the 2,020 produced, a handful of Remington 1890s saw service as side arms by Indian police on Western reservations.

== Remington Model 1888 (transitional) single-action Army revolver ==
Remington Model 1888 (Transitional) Single Action Army
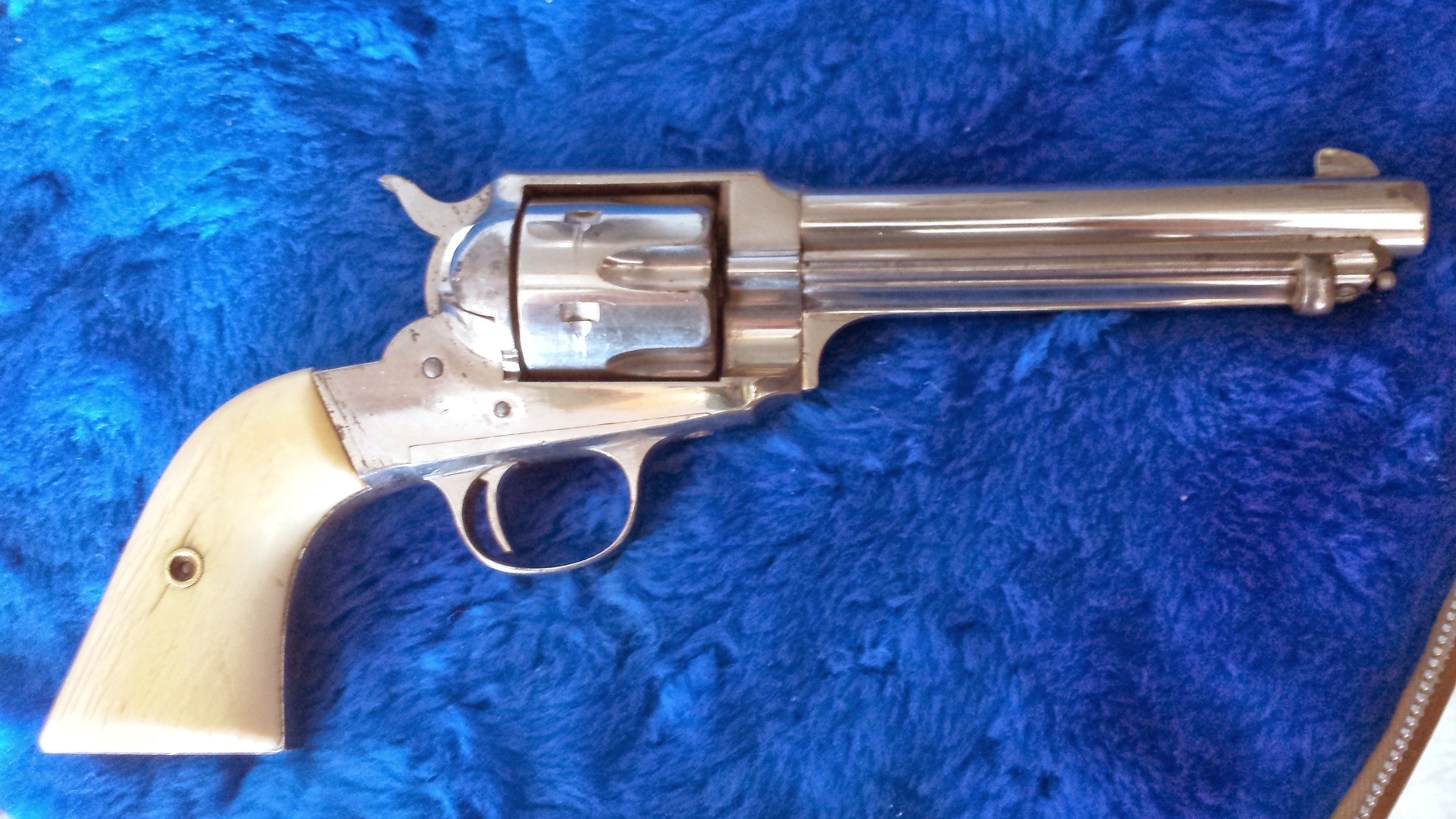
- Type: Revolver
- Place of origin: United States

Production history
- Manufacturer: Remington Arms
- Produced: 1888–1889

Specifications
- Barrel length: 5.5 in (139.7 mm)
- Cartridge: .44-40 Winchester.44 Remington
- Action: Single-action
- Maximum firing range: 50 meters (54.7 yards)
- Feed system: Six-shot cylinder
- Sights: Milled groove in the rear of the top-strap, front blade.

An intermediate (transitional) model of cartridge revolver was introduced in 1888 called the "New Model Pocket Army". Made in 1888 and 1889 only, total production was less than 1,000 units, made primarily with parts from 1875s and duplicate "batch/serial" numbers exist; however, assembly numbers were added and none have been found over the low 300s range. Nearly all are nickel, with less than a handful known manufactured in blue. Visually it is identical to the Model 1890, with the exception of the address on top of barrel. The caliber of the model was .44-40, with the left grip on many marked "44" or "44W". In a dealer catalog, the barrel is listed at 5 1/2 inches, but examples have been found with 5 3/4-inch barrels. The ejector housing is visually identical to the Model 1890. New York sporting arms dealers Hartley and Graham assumed control of the E. Remington & Sons and renamed the company to Remington Arms Company in 1888, and it is possible that this model was assembled exclusively for them.

== Modern reproduction ==
The Uberti 1890 revolvers are reproductions (but not exact copies) of the famous old Remington revolver, but chambered for more modern smokeless powder cartridges as the .357 Magnum. So, while it looks and feels like an old-west "cowboy" gun, it has metallurgy common to more modern revolvers. Like all weapons, the Uberti 1890 must be taken apart periodically for cleaning. Because it is a revolver with so few moving parts, however, disassembly in this case is limited to simply removing the cylinder from the main revolver body.
