= Remington Model 1875 =

Remington Model 1875 Single Action Army
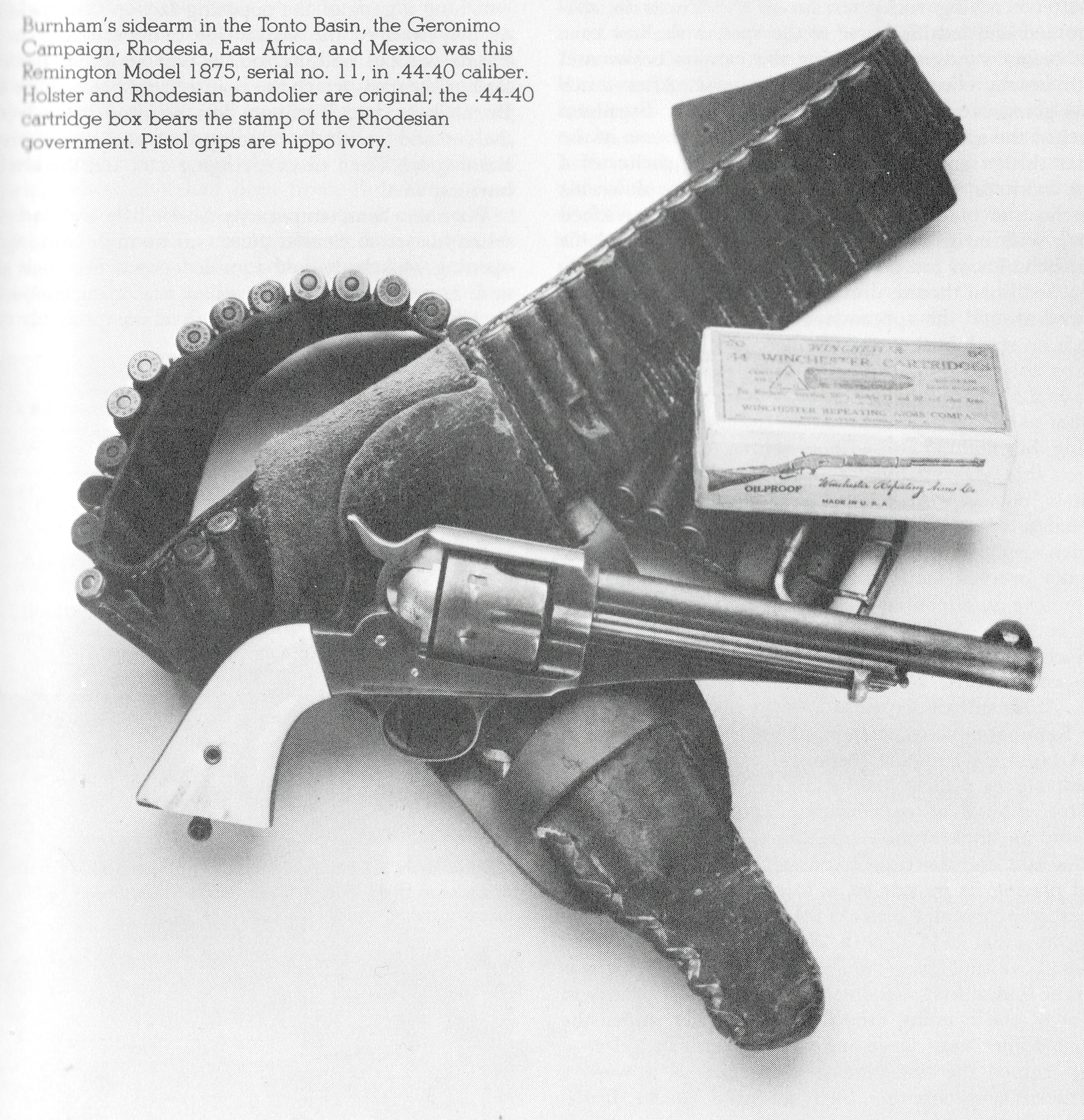
- .44-40 Remington 1875
- Type: Revolver
- Place of origin: United States

Production history
- Manufacturer: Remington Arms
- Produced: 1875–1889

Specifications
- Barrel length: 5 1/2 in, 7 in, 8 in (139.7 mm, 178 mm, 203 mm)
- Cartridge: .45 Colt.44-40 Winchester.44 Remington
- Action: Single-action
- Maximum firing range: 55 yards (50 meters)
- Feed system: 6-shot Cylinder
- Sights: Milled groove in the rear of the top-strap, Front blade.

Remington Model 1875 Single Action Army (a.k.a. Improved Army or Frontier Army) was a revolver by E. Remington & Sons. It was based upon the successful New Model Army (Remington Model 1858) with both revolvers having the same size, appearance, and the removable cylinder. The new 1875 Remington differed mainly from the older 1858 percussion model by having a bored through cylinder chambered for metallic cartridges. Thus, in 1875, Remington entered the cartridge revolver market with this big-frame, army style revolver, intended to compete with the Colt Peacemaker. Ordinary citizens and Old West lawmen alike recognized the sturdy quality of the new Remington revolvers. This design was followed by the Model 1888 and the Model 1890.

== Overview ==
Introduced to compete with Colt's single-action Army revolvers, this Remington design failed to meet with the commercial success made by Colt's model due to the Hartford firm's two-year head start in production and sales.

Also known as the "Improved Army" or "Frontier Army" revolver, this single-action was a competitor to Colt's popular Single Action Army line. By the time of its introduction, however, Colt had already secured contracts with the U.S. Army, and Remington was forced to seek other markets. The U.S. government purchased fewer than 650 for use by Indian police, and another 1,000 were sold to the Mexican government circa 1880. The Egyptian government contracted for delivery of 10,000, but few were produced and delivered due to significant unpaid debts owed by the Egyptians for rolling-block rifles.

Between 25,000 and 30,000 were manufactured during the years 1875–1889 in three different chamberings: .44 Remington Centerfire; .44-40; and .45 caliber. These were not optional; rather, the caliber of production models was determined by their date of manufacture. .45 caliber cylinders were slightly longer to prevent accidental insertion into a .44 frame. Standard features included a fluted cylinder, walnut grip panels, blued or nickel-plated finish with case-hardened hammer and loading gate, and a lanyard ring. Standard barrel length was 7 1/2 inches (190 mm), although very few revolvers were produced with 5 3/4-inch (150 mm) barrels.

== Modern reproduction ==
The Uberti 1875 Outlaw, Frontier, and Police revolvers are reproductions of the famous old Remington 1875 and 1890 revolver, but chambered for more modern smokeless powder cartridges as the .357 Magnum. Cimarron Firearms offers a version built to their specifications by Uberti as well. These modern reproductions have the look and feel of old-west "cowboy" guns, but have the metallurgy common to more modern revolvers.
