= .46 rimfire =

.46 caliber pistol and rifle cartridge

.46 Short
- Type: Revolver
- Place of origin: United States

Production history
- Designer: Remington
- Designed: 1868
- Produced: 1868–1917

Specifications
- Case type: Rimmed, straight
- Bullet diameter: .456 in (11.6 mm)
- Neck diameter: .458 in (11.6 mm)
- Base diameter: .458 in (11.6 mm)
- Rim diameter: .530 in (13.5 mm)
- Case length: 0.836 in (21.2 mm)
- Overall length: 1.336 in (33.9 mm)
- Primer type: Rimfire

.46 rimfire / 11.6x21mmRF is a family of rimfire cartridges which were chambered in revolvers and rifles in the late 19th and early 20th centuries. They were primarily made in short, long and extra long lengths; however, a variety of other lengths were designed. Manufacturers in the USA discontinued making .46 Short and .46 Long ammunition after the country's entrance into World War I in 1917; however, production of .46 Extra Long / 11.6x39mmRF continued after the war.

== History ==
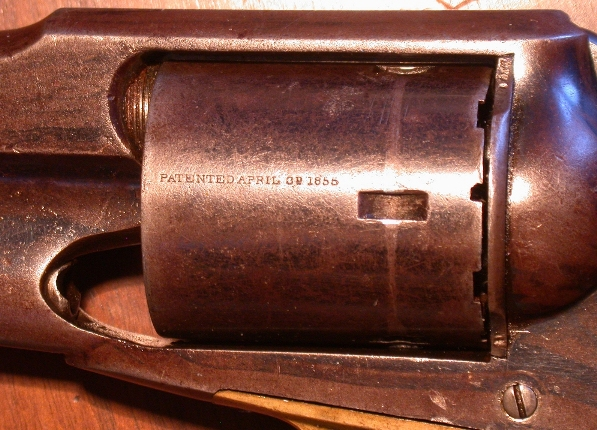
Remington Conversion, Rollin White Patent

The .46 Short was used in the first large-caliber metallic cartridge revolvers available. Previously Smith & Wesson, who owned the Rollin White patent, had produced the Model 1 in .22 Short and Model 2 in .32 Short. In 1868, Remington paid a royalty fee to Smith & Wesson for use of the Rollin White patent and began to produce .46 Short metallic cartridge conversions for their New Model Army. These converted revolvers were also capable of firing the .46 Long cartridges when they were introduced a few years later.

== Technical background ==
The Remington New Model Army was a .44 caliber percussion cap revolver. In the nomenclature of the time, .44 caliber referred to the bore diameter of the barrel which was nominally 0.440". The grooves of the rifling were .006-.007" deep so the groove diameter was nominally 0.451-0.454". These revolvers were generally loaded with a .457" diameter lead ball (48-gauge), ensuring a good seal in the chamber. On conversion to cartridge ammunition, the nomenclature changed so that the name of the cartridge was based on the size of the projectile, hence the .46 Short (0.458" diameter bullet) fit the .44 caliber revolver.

== See also ==
- Table of handgun and rifle cartridges
