= .44 Colt =

Revolver cartridge

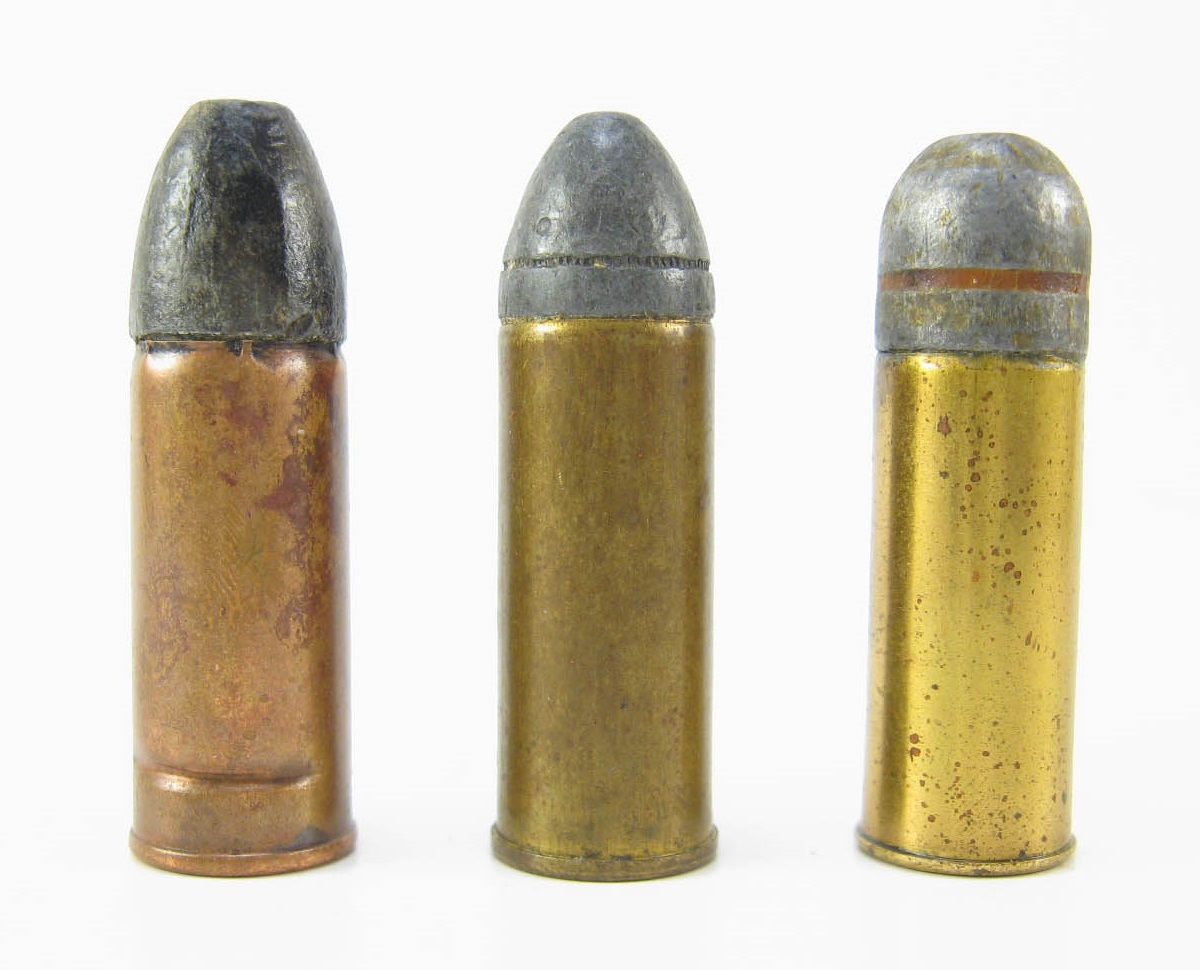
- Benet primed .44 Colt & Remington, .44 Colt and .44 Remington.
- Type: Revolver
- Place of origin: United States

Service history
- In service: 1871–1873
- Used by: United States Army

Production history
- Produced: 1871–1940

Specifications
- Case type: rimmed straight
- Bullet diameter: .451 in (11.5 mm)
- Base diameter: .456 in (11.6 mm)
- Rim diameter: .483 in (12.3 mm)
- Case length: 1.10 in (28 mm)
- Overall length: 1.50 in (38 mm)
- Rifling twist: 1:16 in (410 mm)
- Primer type: large pistol

Ballistic performance
Bullet mass/type	Velocity	Energy
225 gr (15 g) (U.S. Army black powder load)	640 ft/s (200 m/s)	207 ft⋅lbf (281 J)
225 gr (15 g) (factory load)	640 ft/s (200 m/s)	207 ft⋅lbf (281 J)
210 gr (14 g) (factory load)	660 ft/s (200 m/s)	206 ft⋅lbf (279 J)
210 gr (14 g) (original factory black powder load)	660 ft/s (200 m/s)	206 ft⋅lbf (279 J)
210 gr (14 g) (smokeless, Lyman #429185)	650 ft/s (200 m/s)	197 ft⋅lbf (267 J)
- Sources: Barnes & Amber 1972

The .44 Colt / 11.5x28mmR is an American centerfire revolver cartridge that was produced commercially from 1871 to 1940.

== History ==
The cartridge was developed by Colt's Patent Firearms for use in cartridge revolvers based on the 1860 Army percussion revolver. The cartridge was briefly adopted by the United States Army, around 1871. The Army used it until 1873, at which time it was replaced by the better known and more powerful .45 Colt cartridge used in the recently adopted Colt Single Action Army revolver.

The .44 Colt was made for use in the Richards-Mason conversion of Colt's 1860 Army percussion revolver. The conversion process involved boring through the chambers of the obsolete cap and ball revolvers and adding a breech-plate with a gated loading port to enable them to chamber centerfire metallic cartridges.

This process left a chamber of uniform diameter, with no step at the front. Thus the bullet and the brass case were made the same diameter, .451-.454 in, with a short "heel" section at the base of the bullet of smaller diameter inserted in the mouth of the case, similar to the construction of .22 rimfire ammunition.

Modern .44 Colt ammunition is dimensionally similar to .44 Special with regard to bullet diameter and case width, the main exceptions being the shorter case length and smaller rim diameter.

== Ballistics ==
The original .44 Colt loading used a heeled, outside lubricated bullet. The major diameter of the bullet was approximately the groove diameter (.451 in) of the converted ".44" cap and ball revolver. The smaller "heel" at the base of the bullet was sized to fit inside the brass case at approximately .430 in.

Upon firing, the ductile soft lead bullet (alloys of pure to nearly pure lead were used) allowed the base of the bullet to "bump up" to first the chamber diameter in the cylinder, then jump the gap, through the forcing cone into the rifling. This is effective with black powder, but less so with smokeless powder. Alloying the lead with tin or antimony to harden it makes this nearly impossible. Use of hard alloys typically leads to poor accuracy.

Benet cup and Martin-type primers were later replaced by more reliable Boxer type primers.

The ballistic performance of the original .44 Colt is comparable to the .44 Remington, and less powerful than modern .44 Russian loads. Cases for the modern .44 Colt-chambered handguns are typically made using trimmed .44 Magnum, .44 Special, or .44 Russian brass and a historically inaccurate .429 lead bullet instead of the older outside-lubricated heeled bullet with a larger, .451 diameter.

Commercial black powder and smokeless ammunition remained available until around 1940, by which time the .44 Colt had been entirely supplanted by more modern handgun cartridges such as the .38 Special and .44 Special.

The modern sport of cowboy action shooting has stimulated renewed interest in obsolete revolver cartridges like .44 Colt and, for the first time in nearly 100 years, commercially produced .44 Colt ammunition is available. Brass is available from Starline and can be made by trimming the length of .44 Special cases.

== See also ==
- List of cartridges by caliber
- 11mm caliber

== Sources ==
- Barnes, Frank C., ed. by John T. Amber. ".44 Colt", in Cartridges of the World, pp. 169 & 177. Northfield, IL: DBI Books, 1972. ISBN 0-695-80326-3.
- Fitzsimons, Bernard, ed. Illustrated Encyclopedia of 20th Century Weapons & Warfare, Volume 20, p. 2192, "Remington". London: Phoebus, 1978.
