= Remington Model 1858 =

Remington New Model Army
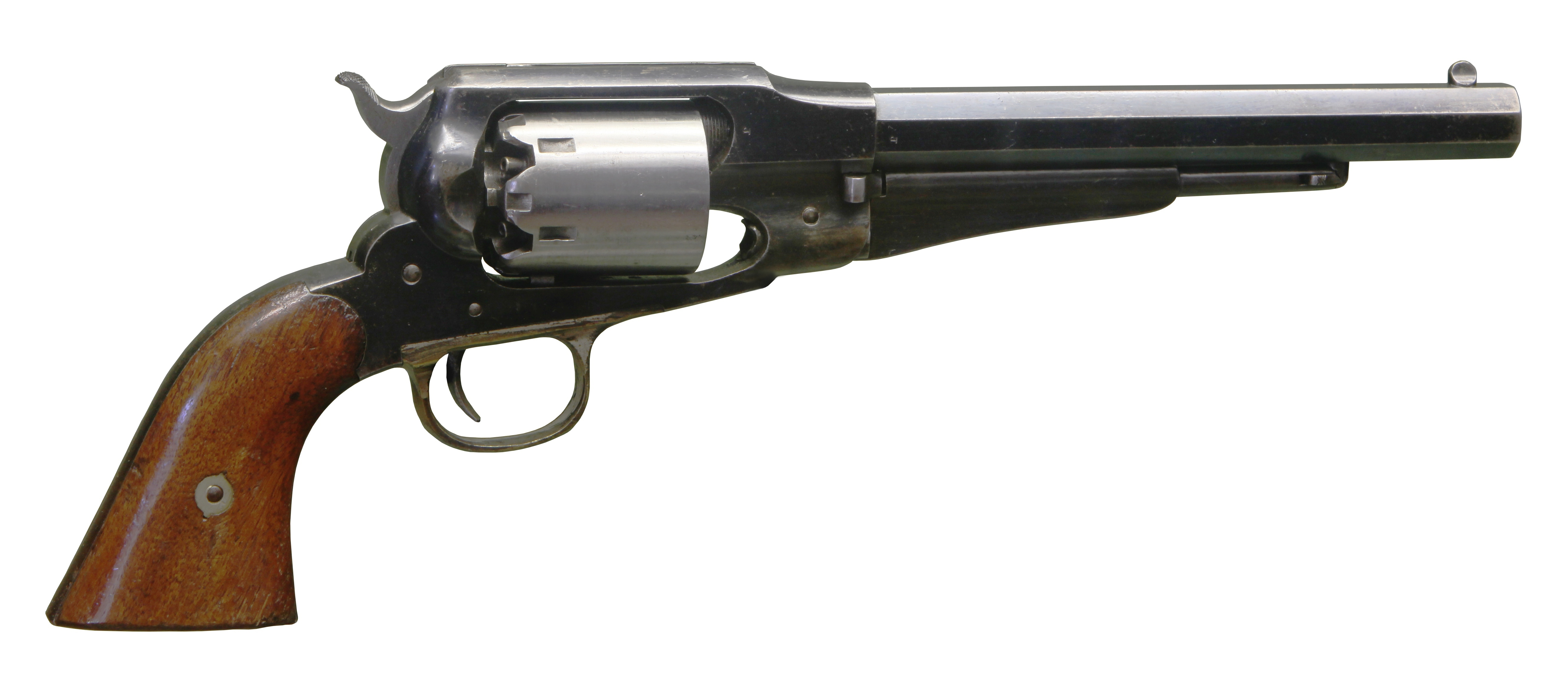
- Remington New Model Army Revolver made c. 1863 - 1875.
- Type: Revolver
- Place of origin: United States

Service history
- In service: 1861–1873
- Used by: United States; Confederate States; Native Americans; Hawaiian Kingdom; United Kingdom; Canada; Australia; France; Russian Empire; Empire of Japan; Second Mexican Empire
- Wars: American Civil War; American Indian Wars; Fenian Raid; Red River Rebellion; Franco-Prussian War; Boshin War; Second French intervention in Mexico

Production history
- Designer: Fordyce Beals
- Designed: 1858
- Manufacturer: Remington Arms
- Produced: 1861 to 1875
- No. built: Over 230,000
- Variants: 10

Specifications
- Mass: 2 lb, 13 oz (1.27 kg)
- Length: 13.25 in (337 mm)
- Barrel length: 8 in (203 mm)
- Cartridge: Powder & ball or Paper cartridge with conical bullet Metallic cartridge for conversion
- Caliber: .31, .36, and .44 percussion,.32 rimfire (converted),.38 centerfire (converted),.38 rimfire (converted),.44 centerfire (converted),.46 rimfire (converted)
- Action: Single-action
- Muzzle velocity: 550–1286 ft/s
- Effective firing range: Sighted in at 75 yards
- Feed system: 6 round cylinder (5 round pocket)
- Sights: Fixed Post, Notched Top Strap

The Remington-Beals Model Revolvers along with subsequent models and variations were percussion revolvers manufactured by Eliphalet Remington & Sons in .31 (Pocket) .36 (Navy) or .44 (Army) caliber, used during the American Civil War, and were the beginning of a successful line of medium and large frame pistols. They are commonly, though inaccurately, referred to as the Model 1858 due to the patent markings on its New Model barrels, "PATENTED SEPT. 14, 1858/E. REMINGTON & SONS, ILION, NEW YORK, U.S.A./NEW MODEL."; although wide scale production did not start until 1861.

The Remington revolver was a secondary, supplemental issue firearm for the Union Army until the Colt factory fire of 1864. Due to the fire, the Colt 1860 Army was not available for some time. Subsequently, large numbers of the Remington revolver were ordered by the U.S. government. Samuel Remington traveled to Washington in the fall of 1861, offering to sell his revolvers to the government at a cost of $15 each—or $10 less than what Colt was charging the Ordnance Department for its .44-cal. revolvers. Even with the reduced cost, the Army, by the end of March 1862, had taken delivery from the Remington factory of only 7,250 .36-cal. revolvers and 850 .44-cal. Beals revolvers at a cost to the Army of $15 each.

It saw use in the American West, both in its original percussion configuration and as a metallic cartridge conversion, as well as around the world.

== Overview ==
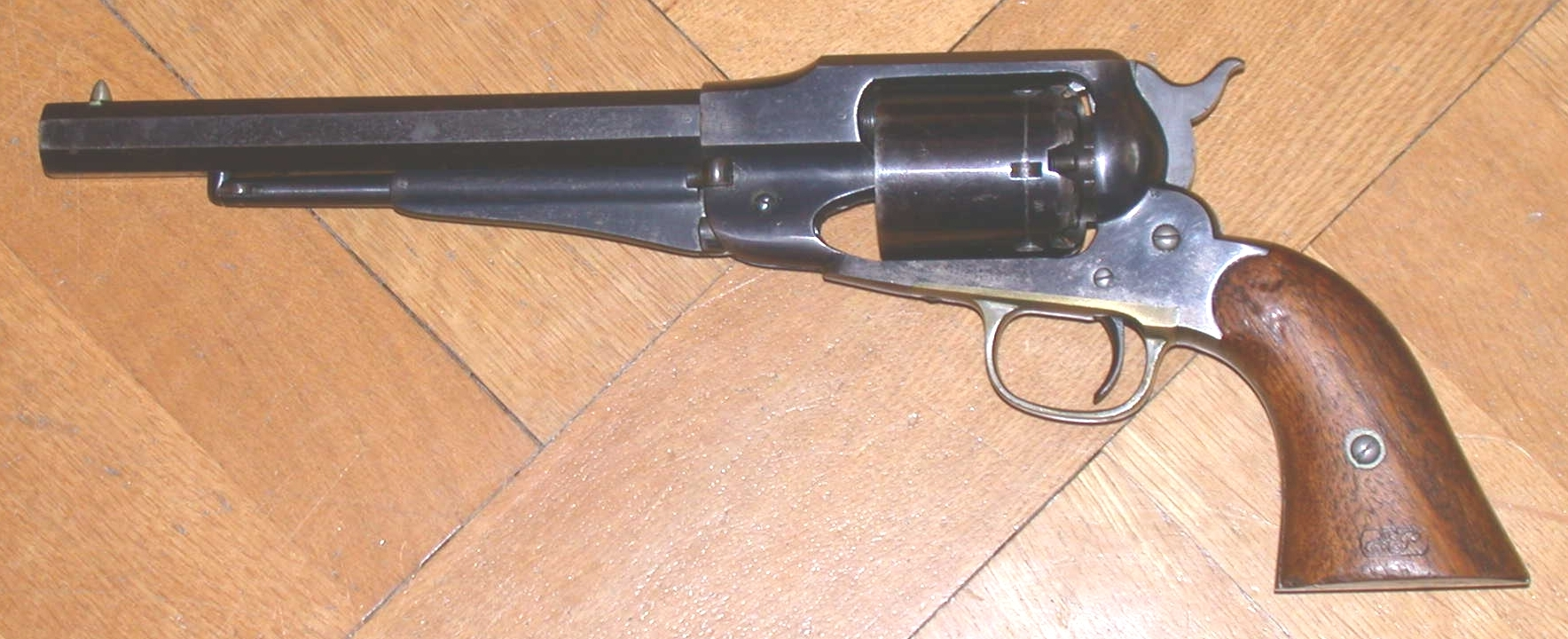
Remington New Model Army Revolver, early model with mortised frontsight

The Remington is a single-action, percussion revolver produced by E. Remington & Sons, Ilion, N.Y., based on the Fordyce Beals patent of September 14, 1858 (Patent 21,478). The cylinder holds six shots. The Remington Army revolver is large-framed revolver in .44 caliber with an 8-inch barrel length. The Remington Navy revolver is slightly smaller framed than the Army and in .36 caliber with a 7.375 inch [Beals Navy 7.5 inch] barrel length. There were three progressive models made: the Remington-Beals Army & Navy (1860–1862), the 1861 Army & Navy (1862–1863), and the New Model Army & Navy (1863–1875). The three models are nearly identical in size and appearance. Subtle but noticeable differences in hammers, loading levers, and cylinders help identify each model. The 1861 Remington actually transitioned into New Model appearance by late 1862, slowly transforming throughout 1862, due to continual improvement suggestions from the U. S. Ordnance Department.

Remington percussion revolvers are very accurate and capable of considerable power with muzzle velocities in the range of 550 to 1286+ feet-per-second, depending upon the charge loaded by the shooter. Combustible cartridge velocities averaged from 700 to 900 feet per second (270 m/s), depending on powder quality, charge and conical bullet weight. Combustibles were usually loaded with a special high performance sporting grade black powder, using the minimum charge required for a specified impact level, usually determined by pine penetration tests. The special powder and minimal charge reduced black powder fouling, allowing revolvers to be fired as much as possible before cleaning was necessary.

=== Design ===
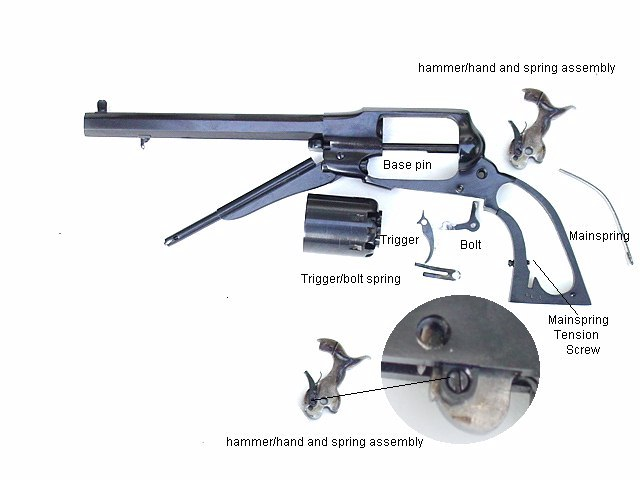
New Model Army Fully disassembled

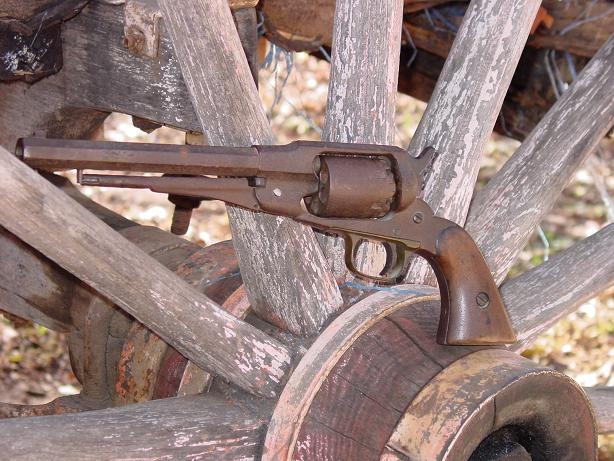
Original Remington New Model Navy, 36 caliber

The Remington revolver owes its durability to the "topstrap", solid-frame design. The design is effectively as strong and resistant to frame stretching as the steel-framed open-top revolvers of the same era, while being simpler to produce than an open-top revolver of adequate strength. The internal lockwork of the Remington is also simpler in construction. While the Colt employs separate screws for the cylinder stop and trigger, those components share the same through-frame screw in the Remington design. A downside in the design of the 1858 is that the barrel and receiver are a single piece, making it more difficult to clean the barrel, as it cannot be removed.

Another innovative feature (first appearing in the 1863 Model production series) was "safety slots" milled between chambers on the cylinder. The milled slot positively secured the hammer between chambers for safe carry by placing the hammer's firing pin where it did not rest on a percussion cap, eliminating the risk of an accidental discharge if the gun was dropped or the hammer struck. Most 19th-century revolver designs lacked such safety features. Early Whitney revolvers, for example, were similar to the Remington but lacked the safety slots. It was possible to lower the Whitney hammer between cylinder chambers for safe carry, but without the Remington milled slot, the Whitney cylinder could possibly slip and rotate, allowing the hammer to strike a loaded, capped chamber and cause an accidental discharge.

The Remington revolver permitted easy cylinder removal, allowing a quick reload with a spare pre-loaded cylinder; this being an advantage over other revolver designs of the time. It is, however, unlikely that this was common practice during the period. Spare cylinders were not provided by the Army. There is also the inherent risk associated with carrying extra loaded and capped cylinders which could be dropped and accidentally discharged.

=== Metallic cartridge conversions ===
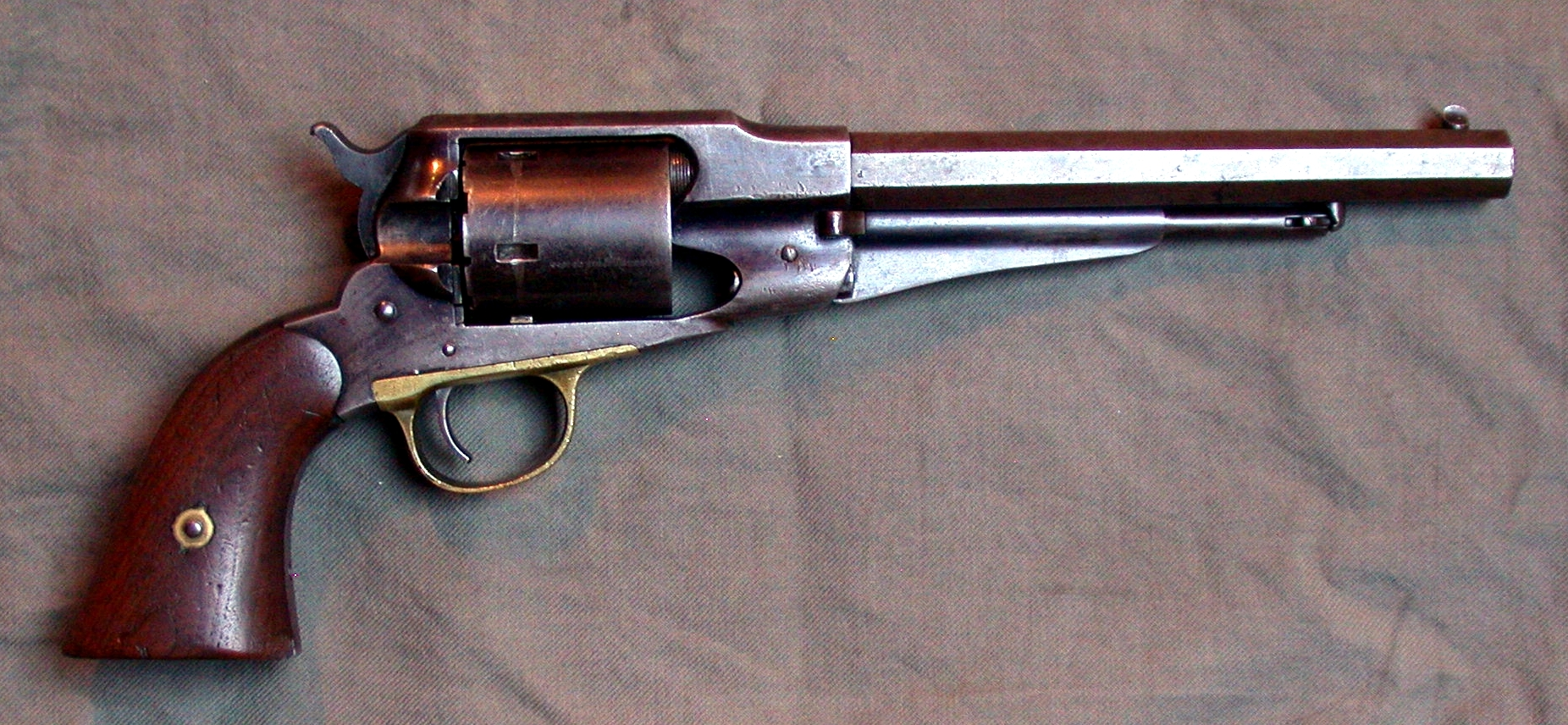
Remington Conversion cal .46 RF

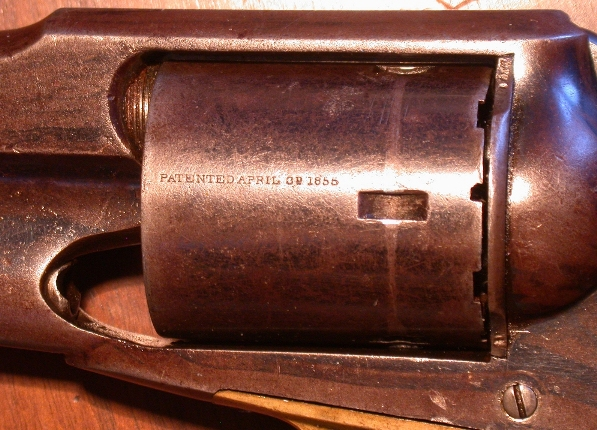
Remington Conversion, Rollin White Patent

In 1868, Remington began offering five-shot metallic cartridge conversions of the revolver in .46 rimfire. Remington paid a royalty fee to Smith & Wesson, owners of the Rollin White patent (#12,648, April 3, 1855) on bored-through revolver cylinders for metallic cartridge use. The Remington Army cartridge-conversions were the first large-caliber cartridge revolvers available, beating even Smith & Wesson's .44 American to market by nearly two years.

Due to the large volume of these pistols, individual gunsmiths also produced cartridge conversions (from cap and ball versions) in a variety of calibers such as .44-40 and .45 Colt.

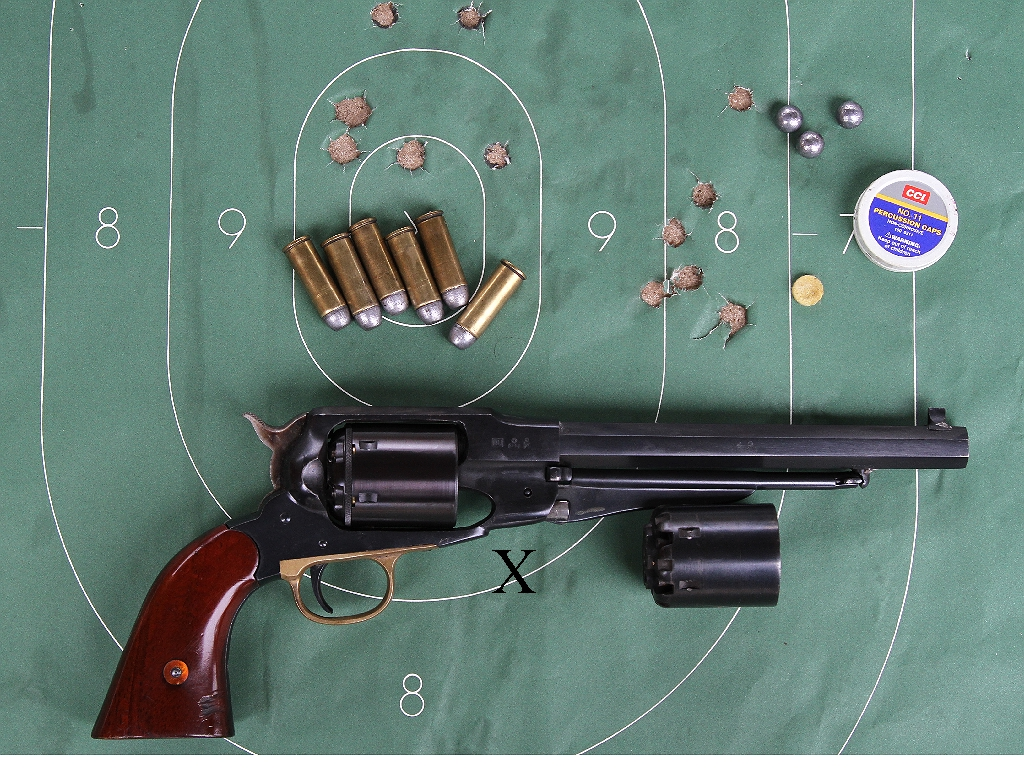
Modern reproduction with conversion cylinder

=== Buffalo Bill Cody pistol ===
William F. "Buffalo Bill" Cody used an ivory-handled New Model Army .44, serial number 73,293, from 1863 until 1906, when he gave it to his ranch foreman with a handwritten note which said that, "It never failed me."

In June 2012, the pistol came up for sale at auction and sold for a reported sum of US$239,000. The Heritage Auctions company represented the pistol as "The Most Important William F. "Buffalo Bill" Cody Gun Extant". Accompanying the sale of the pistol were personal artifacts of Cody's including seventeen handwritten letters.

== Model series ==
The various pistols in this series with pertinent data.

Model	Frame	Years Mfg'd	Caliber(s)	Production	Barrel	Notes
Remington-Beals Army Model Revolver	Large	1861–1862	.44	1,900 (estimated)	8 inch octagon	
Remington-Beals Navy Model Revolver	Large	1861–1862	.36	14,500 (estimated)	7 1/2-inch octagon	
1861 Army Revolver (Old Model Army)	Large	1862	.44	6,000 (estimated)	8 inch octagon	
1861 Navy Revolver	Large	1862	.36	7,000 (estimated)	7 3/8 inch octagon	
New Model Army Revolver	Large	1863-1875	.44	132,000 (approximately)	8 inch octagon	Used for factory conversions in .46 RF & .44 Colt
New Model Navy Revolver	Large	1863–1875	.36	28,000 (approximately)	7 3/8 inch octagon	Used for factory conversions to .38 RF & U.S. Navy conversions to .38 Long Colt
New Model Single Action Belt Revolver	Large	1863–1875	.36 percussion and .38 RF	4,500 based on serial numbers	6 1/2-inch octagon	Factory conversion production started in 1873
Remington-Rider Double Action New Model Belt Revolver	Large	1863–1873	.36 percussion and .38 RF	5,500 (based on serial numbers)	6 1/2-inch octagon	1863-1865 some early guns had a fluted cylinder, rest were round, conversions had two-piece cylinder
New Model Police Revolver	Medium	1865–1873	.36 percussion and .38 RF	25,000 (estimated)	3 1/2, 4 1/2, 5 1/2, 6 1/2-inch octagon	Conversions all believed to be rimfire only
New Model Pocket Revolver	Small	1865–1873	.31 percussion and .32 RF	25,000 (estimated)	3, 3 1/2, 4, 4 1/2, 5 1/2	Majority produced as conversions or cartridge, 5 round cylinders only with a spur trigger

== Modern use ==
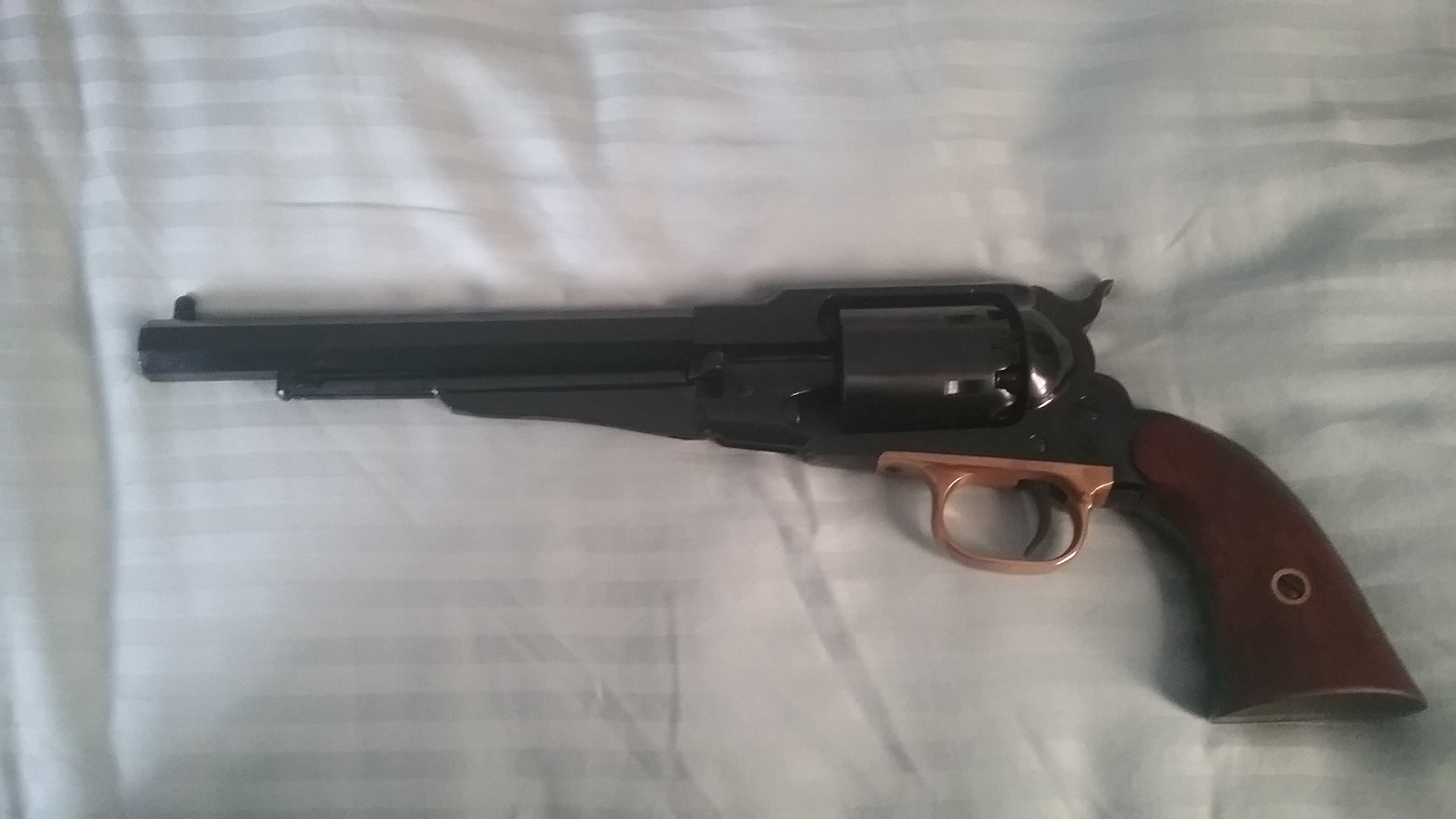
A New Model Army replica made by Pietta

The Remington-Beals design lives on today in the form of replicas from Italian manufacturers Uberti, Pietta, and Euroarms; available in modern steel, and brass frame. The Euroarms and Uberti New Model Army replicas are nearly identical to the originals. These replicas are very popular in civil war reenacting and Cowboy Action Shooting. Several companies produce drop-in "conversion" cylinders for replicas, enabling the firing of low-pressure modern cartridges without altering the revolver's frame. These conversions, of course, being akin to the original Remington cartridge conversions used on the Western frontier of the 1860s and 1870s. The percussion cylinder can be used interchangeably. Due to the value and delicacy of the original revolvers, they are not recommended for modern shooting purposes.
