= .38 rimfire =

Firearm cartridge

.38 Short rimfire
- Type: Rifle and handgun
- Place of origin: United States

Service history
- Used by: US Army

Production history
- Variants: Short, Long, and Extra Long

Specifications
- Case type: Rimmed, straight
- Bullet diameter: .374 in (9.5 mm)
- Neck diameter: .376 in (9.6 mm)
- Shoulder diameter: .376 in (9.6 mm)
- Base diameter: .378 in (9.6 mm)
- Rim diameter: .433 in (11.0 mm)
- Rim thickness: .051 in (1.3 mm)
- Case length: 0.730 in (18.5 mm)
- Overall length: 1.195 in (30.4 mm)
- Primer type: Rimfire
- Maximum pressure: 13,000 psi (89.63 MPa)

Ballistic performance
Bullet mass/type	Velocity	Energy
150 gr (10 g) LRN	650 ft/s (200 m/s)	141 ft⋅lbf (191 J)
- Test barrel length: Rifle

.38 Long rimfire
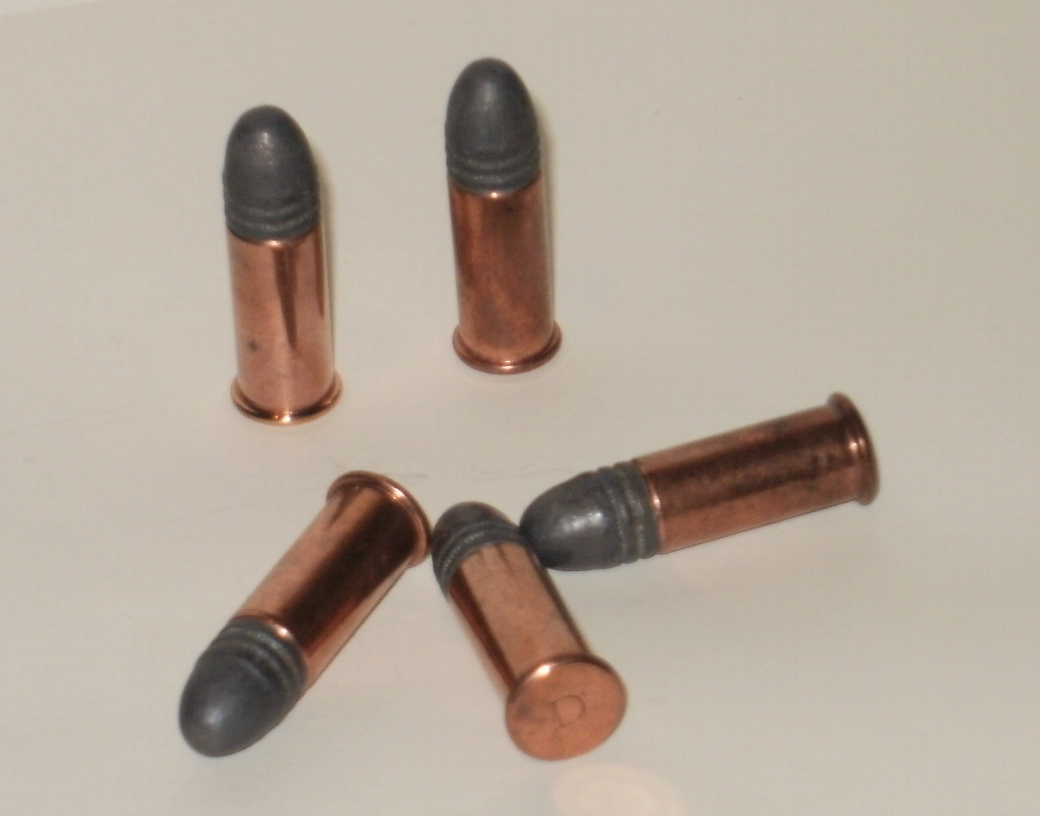
- Type: Rifle and handgun
- Place of origin: United States

Service history
- Used by: US Army

Production history
- Variants: Short, Long, and Extra Long

Specifications
- Case type: Rimmed, straight
- Bullet diameter: .374 in (9.5 mm)
- Neck diameter: .376 in (9.6 mm)
- Shoulder diameter: .376 in (9.6 mm)
- Base diameter: .378 in (9.6 mm)
- Rim diameter: .433 in (11.0 mm)
- Rim thickness: .051 in (1.3 mm)
- Case length: 0.874 in (22.2 mm)
- Overall length: 1.382 in (35.1 mm)
- Primer type: Rimfire
- Maximum pressure: 13,000 psi (89.63 MPa)

Ballistic performance
Bullet mass/type	Velocity	Energy
150 gr (10 g) LRN	980 ft/s (300 m/s)	320 ft⋅lbf (430 J)
- Test barrel length: Rifle

.38 Extra Long rimfire
- Type: Rifle and handgun
- Place of origin: United States

Specifications
- Case type: Rimmed, straight
- Bullet diameter: .374 in (9.5 mm)
- Neck diameter: .376 in (9.6 mm)
- Shoulder diameter: .376 in (9.6 mm)
- Base diameter: .378 in (9.6 mm)
- Rim diameter: .433 in (11.0 mm)
- Rim thickness: .051 in (1.3 mm)
- Case length: 1.48 in (38 mm)
- Overall length: 2.025 in (51.4 mm)
- Primer type: Rimfire
- Maximum pressure: 14,000–15,000 psi (96.5–103.4 MPa)

Ballistic performance
Bullet mass/type	Velocity	Energy
150 gr (10 g) LRN	1,250 ft/s (380 m/s)	520 ft⋅lbf (710 J)
- Test barrel length: Rifle

The .38 rimfire / 9.5x22mmRF refers to a family of cartridges that have been in service in the United States since the mid-19th century. The cartridges are produced in short, long, and extra long variants.

Much like the smaller .32 rimfire, the rounds were originally manufactured loaded with black powder. In the early 1900s, manufacturers switched to the "new" smokeless powder.

The .38 rimfire was preferred to the .32 rimfire for hunting and self-defense purposes because of its larger diameter bullet and increased muzzle energy.

== History ==
The .38 rimfire cartridge was a common round for many antique revolvers and rifles from the 1870s to the early 1900s. It was a common self-defense round for a small revolver that was often kept in a vest pocket through to the 1890s. Production in the United States of rimfire calibers larger than .22 ceased upon the country's entry into World War II and was never resumed again by any of the major manufacturers. Factory loaded ammunition is no longer available except as collector items.

== Uses and variants ==
The .38 rimfire cartridge was available in short, long, extra long, and also shotshells. Most of the revolvers and rifle which were produced were chambered for either .38 short rifle, or .38 long rifle. While there were a few different rifles produced for the .38 extra long cartridge and a few rolling block, falling block, and bolt-action rifles had smoothbore barrels which had a slight choke which enabled it to shoot the .38 RF shotshells, which was good for hunting small game at close ranges. Hopkins & Allen produced revolvers and rifles chambered for the .38RF. Rifles of this caliber were produced by Remington (the revolving rifle of 1866), Ballard, Stevens and Frank Wesson, and revolvers by Enterprise, Favorite, Forehand & Wadsworth, and Colt.

== See also ==
- .38 Special
- Hopkins & Allen
- Revolvers
- Rifles
- Rimfire ammunition
- American Civil War
