= Model 1897 =

Model 1897 may refer to:

- Bergmann Model 1897, German semi-automatic pistol
- Marlin Model 1897, American lever-action rifle
- Schmidt-Rubin Model 1897 Kadet Rifle, Swiss Army service rifle
- Winchester Model 1897, American pump-action shotgun
