= .32 short =

.32 Short may refer to:

- .32 rimfire, a rimfire pistol cartridge introduced in 1860
- .32 S&W, a centerfire pistol cartridge introduced in 1878
