= Marlin Model 1891 =

- Type: rifle
- Place of origin: United States

Production history
- Manufacturer: Marlin Firearms Company
- Developed into: Marlin Model 1892
- Unit cost: $18 (MSRP in 1891)
- Produced: 1891–1897
- No. built: 18,650

Specifications
- Length: varied
- Cartridge: rimfire or centerfire
- Caliber: .22 rimfire; .32 caliber rimfire; .32 caliber centerfire; .25 caliber; .38 caliber
- Barrels: octagonal-rifled or round-rifled blued steel; 20 inches (0.51 m) to 40 inches (1.0 m) length
- Action: lever
- Feed system: side loaded magazine (first variation); tubular magazine (second and third variation)
- Sights: iron sights (buckhorn rear sights; spear front sight)

The Marlin Model 1891 is an American lever action repeating rifle that was produced by the Marlin Firearms Company from 1891 until 1897. It was the first in a lineage of Marlin rifles built upon its design (followed by the Model 1892, Model 1897, and Model 39).

== Design and characteristics ==
=== General ===
The Model 1891 is a repeating rife with a lever action. The Marlin 1891 has been described as handsome, looking like a smaller-sized version of the larger-caliber guns contemporary to the time of its manufacture. It can be taken down.

Barrel lengths of Model 1891s range between 20 inches (0.51 m) and 40 inches (1.0 m). The most common barrel length for the Model 1891 was 24 inches (0.61 m). The most common barrel shape was with octagonal rifling, though it was also manufactured with a round barrel. The overall length (OAL) of Model 1891s varied, as did weight. A 24 inches (0.61 m) Model 1891 would standardly weight 6.5 pounds (2.9 kg).

The first variation of the Model 1891 was side-loaded, while later variations were tube-loaded. The first variation's side-loading was the only Marlin manufactured rimfire lever-action that had a side-loading design. The tube-loading system on the second and third variation Model 1891s featured a two-piece magazine tube (with an inner and outer tube) loaded through the front end. This tube-loading design became common in many subsequent .22 rimfire rifles of the era.

The standard finish of the Model 1891 is blued. Its hammer, lever, steel buttplate are case hardened. Its stock is made of American walnut. The safety of the Model 1891 is a sear safety system on its lever action, which (when engaged) impedes movement of its hammer. Model 1891s standardly have iron sights with an adjustable buckhorn rear sight and a spear front sight. Model 1891s had a length of pull (LOP) of 13-3/8".

Manufacturer customizations were offered, including plating, engraving, upgraded stocks, as well as varying barrel lengths shapes. Receivers and pistol grip stocks could be special ordered that were case colored.

The uses for Model 1891s are hunting small game and target shooting. In its 1892 catalogue, Marlin recommended the firearm for farmers, advertising that short cartridges were appropriate for small game and long cartridges would "kill hogs or beef very handily." Thousands of Model 1891s remain in use, a credit to its simple design and durable construction.

=== Main variations ===
Three iterations of Model 1891s were produced. The earliest-produced Model 1891s are referred to as "first variation" Model 1891s. These differed from later iterations, being side-loaded. First variation Model 1891s were only manufactured in .22 caliber chambering and were marked with "Marlin Fire-Arms Co. New Haven, Ct. U.S.A./Pat'd Nov.19.1878. April 2.1889. Aug.12 1890" on its barrel. The first variations also featured a solid-topped frame with "Marlin Safety" marked on it, a side-ejecting receiver, and side-loading gate. The first variation also featured a shortened magazine tube. Serial numbers of first variant Model 1891s have been reported as between 47,889 and 77,943. However, did not have a separate series of serial numbers for different models, so it is difficult to verify an exact range of serial numbers.

The second iteration, referred to as "second variation", shifted the gun's design from a side-loaded firearm to a tube loaded firearm. These were marked with ""Marlin Fire-Arms Co. New Haven, Ct. U.S.A./Pat'd Nov.19.1878. April 2.1889. Aug.12 1890. March 1,1892" on the barrel. This was manufactured with diversity in chambering.

Later models are referred to as "third variation". These featured tangs.

=== Chambering, ammunition ===
The most common chamberings for the Model 1891 were .22 caliber and .32 caliber. Model 1891s were also manufactured chambered for .25 caliber and .38 caliber.

The first variation of the Model 1891 was only manufactured in .22 caliber. Model 1891s in .22 caliber chambering were only manufactured for rimfire cartridges (such as .22 Long Rifle). The Model 1891 was the first lever-action rifle to be chambered in .22 long rifle (.22 LR). Model 1891s chambered in .22 caliber were able to fire .22 Short, .22 Long, and .22 LR cartridges interchangeably; with the Model 1891 being the first repeating rifle capable of interchangeably accepting these cartridges.

Model 1891s in .32 caliber were manufactured either to fire rimfire ammunition (such as .32 Remington) or centerfire ammunition.

Model 1891s had a capacity of 14 to 19 rounds.

The Model 1891 was the first rimfire rifle to be manufactured by the Marlin Firearms Company. It was also first rifle by the company to be manufactured in a .22 caliber chambering.

== Production history ==
The Model 1891 was designed by Lewis Hepburn. The gun was introduced with other popular firearms chambered in .22 caliber, hence why it was initially only manufactured chambered in that caliber. Model 1891s were manufactured from 1891 until 1897. Its manufacturer suggested retail price (MSRP) in 1891 was $18 USD.

Approximately 18,650 units were manufactured. Approximately 5,000 were first variants.

== Lineage of subsequent firearms ==
The Marlin 1891 the first in a lineage of subsequent Marlin rifles adapted from its design. Marlin rifles which descended from it included the Model 1892, Model 1897, and Model 39. Between the Model 1891 and these subsequent firearms, millions of units were sold.
