= Marlin Model 1892 =

- Type: rifle
- Place of origin: United States

Production history
- Designed: 1892
- Manufacturer: Marlin Firearms Company
- Developed from: Marlin Model 1891
- Developed into: Marlin Model 1897
- Unit cost: $18 (MSRP in 1896)
- Produced: 1892–1915
- No. built: 45,000+

Specifications
- Length: varied (Note: versions with a 24 inches (610 mm) barrel, have OAL of 41 inches (1.0 m))
- Cartridge: rimfire or centerfire
- Caliber: .22 rimfire; .32 caliber (convertible between rimfire and centerfire)
- Barrels: round-rifled or octagonal-rifled blued steel; 24 inches (610 mm) to 28 inches (710 mm) length
- Action: lever
- Feed system: tubular magazine
- Sights: iron sights (buckhorn or Rocky Mountain rear sights; bead front sight)

Marlin Model 1892 is a lever action rifle that was manufactured in the United States by the Marlin Firearms Company. Production began on the Model 1892s in 1892, and they were sold from 1895 to 1915.

== Design and characteristics ==
The Model 1892 is a lever action firearm, which was manufactured in both .22 rimfire and .32 caliber variants. A rifle, the Model 1892's design improved upon that of the Marlin Model 1891, as magazine improvements allowed .32 caliber Marlin Model 1892s to interchangeably utilize .32 Short or .32 Long cartridges interchangeably. With the earlier Model 1891, they could not be used interchangeably. Magazines for the Model 1892 had capacity for 10 to 25 rounds.

The Model 1892 was sold as a convertible firearm, meaning it was manufactured so that the same firearm could be converted between being configured to fire rimfire ammunition and being configured to fire centerfire ammunition. 32 caliber versions were shipped with two firing pins, one for rimfire and one for centerfire. This would allow it to both handle .32 caliber rimfire (such as .32 Short and .32 Long) as well as .32 caliber centerfire cartridges (such as .32 Short Colt and .32 Long Colt). When shipped from the manufacturer, the second pin came in a small box that was attached to the lever of the gun. Literature by the manufacturer indicated that the firing pins could be easily changed out without any tools.

Model 1892s were manufactured at barrel lengths of between 24 inches (610 mm) and 28 inches (710 mm). They were manufactured varyingly with either a round or an octagon-rifled blued steel barrel. Many combinations of barrel lengths and shapers were manufactured. On versions with a 24-inch barrel, the overall length (OAL) of the firearm was 41 inches (1.0 m).

Marlin 1892s were able to be ordered from the manufacturer with many customizations, including factory engraving, plating (in nickel, silver or gold), the addition of mounted signs (front and rear; or tang), and a receiver that was case-hardened (case-colored) instead of the factory-standard blued receiver.

The Model 1892 has a hammer as its safety. The length of pull (LOP) of the Model 1892 is 13-3/8". Its factory stock is made of American walnut.

The Model 1892 came with iron sights. For a rear sight, the firearm had a bead. For rear sights, the two factory standard options were adjustable buckhorn sights or Rocky Mountain sights. The .32 caliber version of the Model 1892 was also, at its inception was sold with buckhorn sights, but these were not available on the .22 caliber version until 1907.

In modern use, Model 1892s are considered most-useful for hunting small game and for target shooting. It can be taken down.

== Production history ==
Manufacture of the Model 1892 by the Marlin Firearms Company began in 1892. Its manufacturer suggested retail price (M.S.R.P.) was $18. The Model 1892 was first sold from 1895 to 1915. The year that its sale ended was the same year that Marlin Firearms Company was sold to a syndicate tied to J.P. Morgan to form the Marlin-Rockwell Corporation. The Model 1892 was popular, with more than 45,000 units manufactured.

From 1905 onwards, the Marlin Firearms Company designated the model as "Model 92" instead of the slightly-lengthier original designation as "Model 1892".

== Influence on later gun designs ==
Marlin further improved upon the Model 1892 in its design for the Marlin Model 1897. In turn, the Model 1897's design influenced the Marlin Model 39, which ultimately evolved into the Marlin Model Golden 39A.
