= Merwin & Hulbert =

American firearms designer and marketer

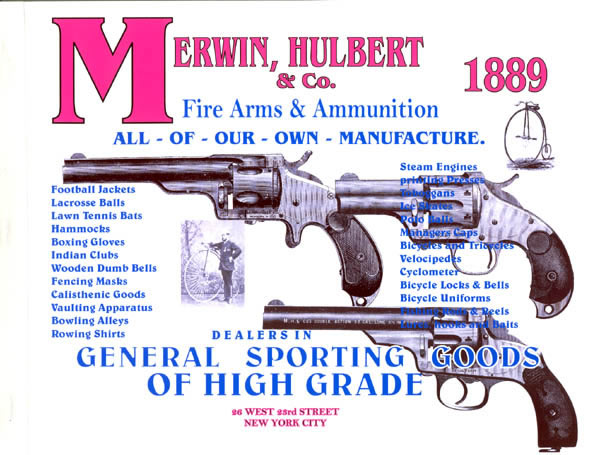

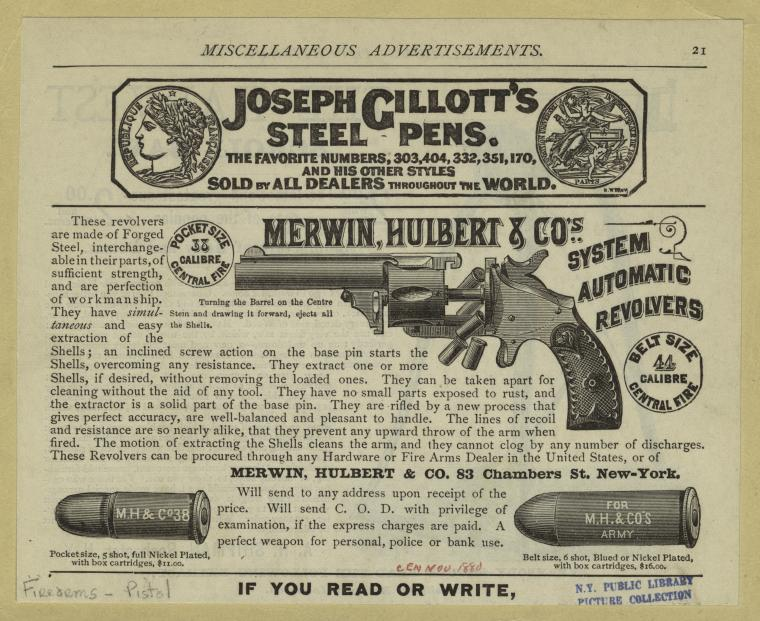
Merwin Hulbert system automatic revolvers advertisement

Merwin, Hulbert, and Co. or Merwin Hulbert was an American firearms designer and marketer based in New York City which produced revolvers and rifles from 1874 to 1896. The firearms were manufactured by a subsidiary company, Hopkins & Allen of Norwich, Connecticut. Merwin Hulbert's designs had influenced other gunmakers of the time, such as Meriden Firearms Co., Harrington & Richardson, Forehand & Wadsworth, and Iver Johnson.

During the late 19th century, Merwin Hulbert revolvers were used by police departments of many cities in the eastern United States.

== History ==
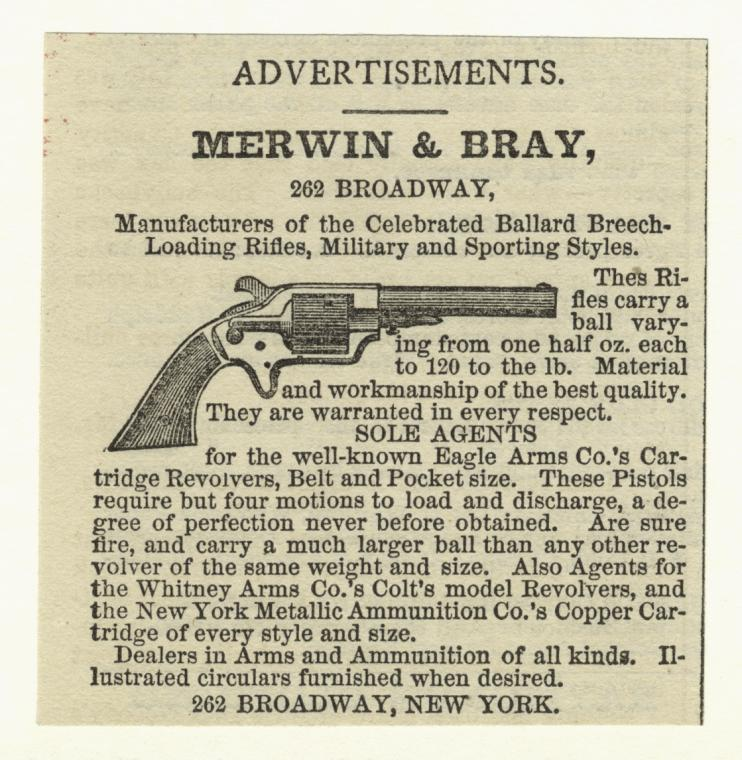
Merwin & Bray advertisement

Joseph Merwin was involved with marketing and manufacturing revolvers as early as 1856 when he formed an arms company known as Merwin & Bray. This company folded after the end of the Civil War. In 1868 Merwin formed a partnership with William and Milan Hulbert, who owned 50% interest in Hopkins & Allen. Merwin and Hulbert not only designed firearms, but imported firearms and retailed firearms and other goods in a large sporting goods endeavor. Merwin and Hulbert additionally purchased several firearms manufacturers. Author Art Phelps opined that if Merwin and Hulbert had not marked the revolvers with the manufacturers name 'Hopkins and Allen' (known for inexpensive and poor quality weapons), the Merwin Hulbert would be as well known as Colt, Smith & Wesson, and Remington.

The company made numerous innovative designs such as folding hammers on their revolvers for pocket carry and a unique takedown system but was plagued by financial missteps. Payment for three sizable shipments to Russia were never realized. The bankruptcy of subsidiary Evans Rifle Company cost Merwin and Hulbert $100,000. A company associate stole the firm's operating capital and disappeared. During 1880–1881, Merwin and Hulbert was in receivership, but it was able to recover.

After Merwin's death in 1888, the company became known as "Hulbert Brothers & Company". Hulbert Brothers declared bankruptcy in 1894 and in 1896 it was liquidated. Hopkins & Allen continued to manufacture Merwin Hulbert style rifles, primarily .22 and .32 caliber single shots, until 1916 when it went bankrupt and was bought the following year by Marlin Firearms.

=== Common and innovative features ===
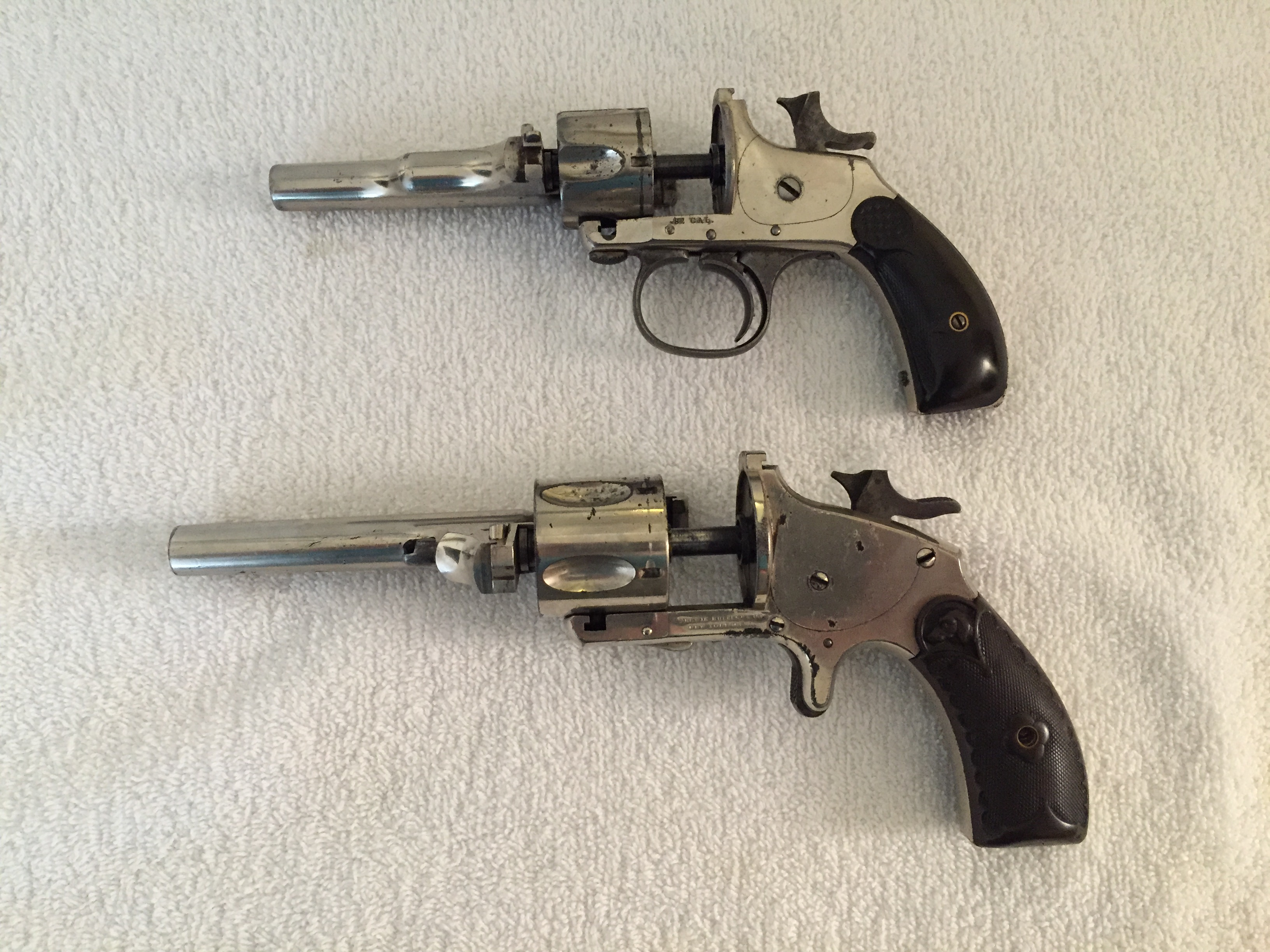
Action open for spent cartridge extraction

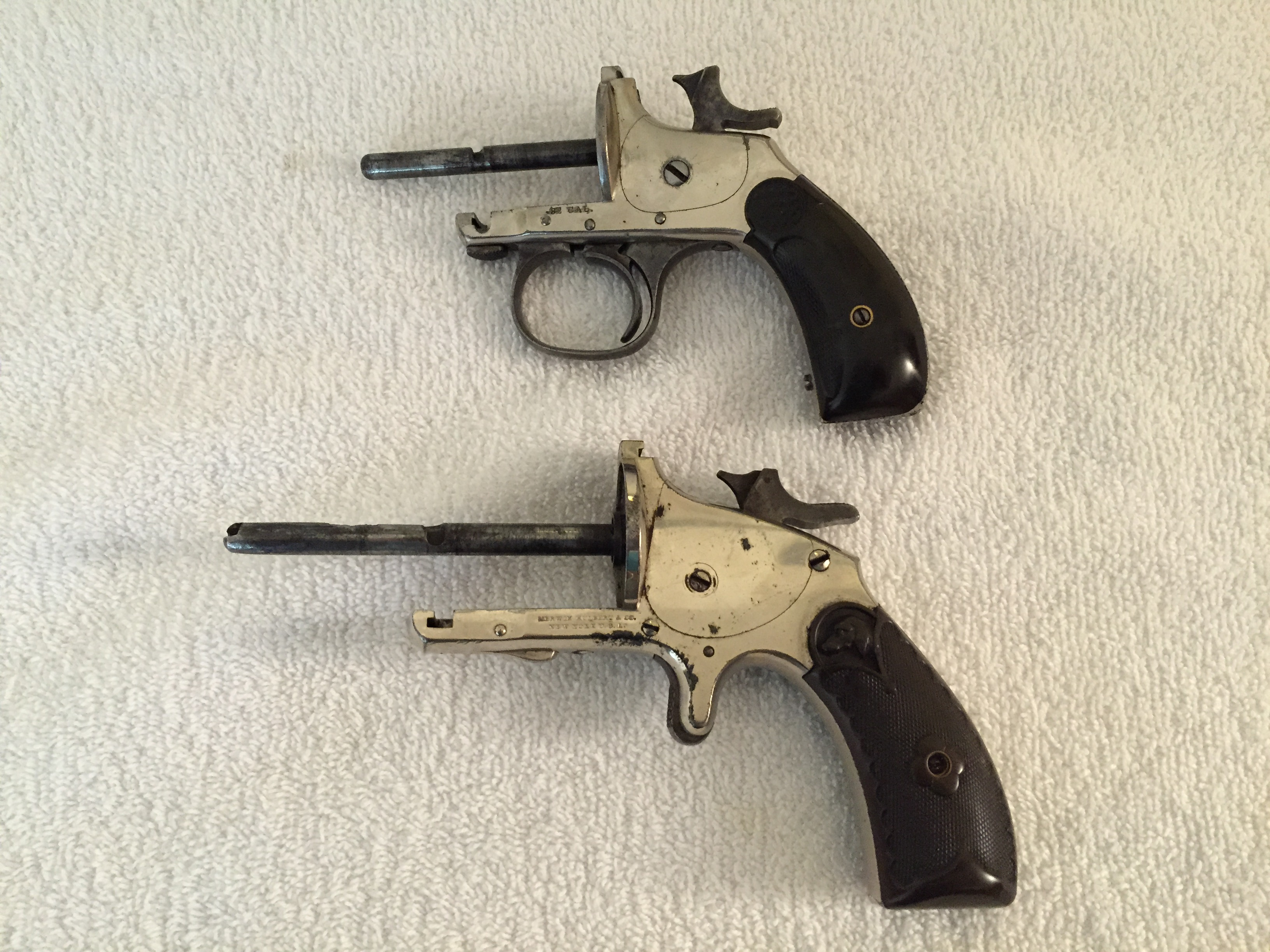
Barrel assembly removed for cleaning

The company developed a nickel plating process superior to their competitors, which was even less expensive than providing bluing. The nickel acted to protect the metal surfaces from corrosion. Because nickel-plated Merwin and Hulbert pistols had the same cost as those without, it is rare to find Merwin and Hulbert revolvers with a blued finish.

A key innovation was a rotating barrel design which allowed the user to rotate the barrel 90 degrees in order to pull the barrel and cylinder forward to remove the fired cartridge cases. During the twisting motion, the empty case could be extracted. Any intact cartridge would remain in the chamber due to the additional length of the bullet. The tight machining tolerances would create a vacuum when the barrel and cylinder were pulled forward, literally causing the assembly to 'snap back' closed when released. In addition to this unique case extraction system, pressing an additional lever control when the frame was 'open' for extraction allowed the owner to completely remove the barrel. Note: early models also required pushing out a barrel wedge similar in function to Colt percussion revolvers. This not only facilitated cleaning, but allowed the owner to swap barrels, allowing for a shorter 'concealed carry' and longer 'field' weapon in one. The combination of extraction and barrel removal required very precise manufacturing tolerances—incredible considering the tools of the day.

According to Arthur Corbin Gould, Merwin Hulbert revolvers were considered to be the strongest revolvers made during the late 19th century.

=== 21st century revival ===
In 2010, it was announced that the name of the company had been purchased, as well as all of the designs and patents, by gun maker Michael Blank. Blank plans to reintroduce the revolvers made on modern machinery with modern materials. In 2012, the revived Merwin Hulbert company was bought by Sharps Rifle Company, Inc. Potential buyers were encouraged to send in deposits; however, none of those potential buyers ever received a firearm. Broadsword Group, the purchaser of Sharps Rifle Company, announced on their website their commitment to return deposits of those who pre-ordered and the discontinuation of any further involvement in the production of Merwin Hulbert revolvers; although, they did indicate they are seeking to sell the design to a company that already specializes in reproduction firearms.

== Models ==
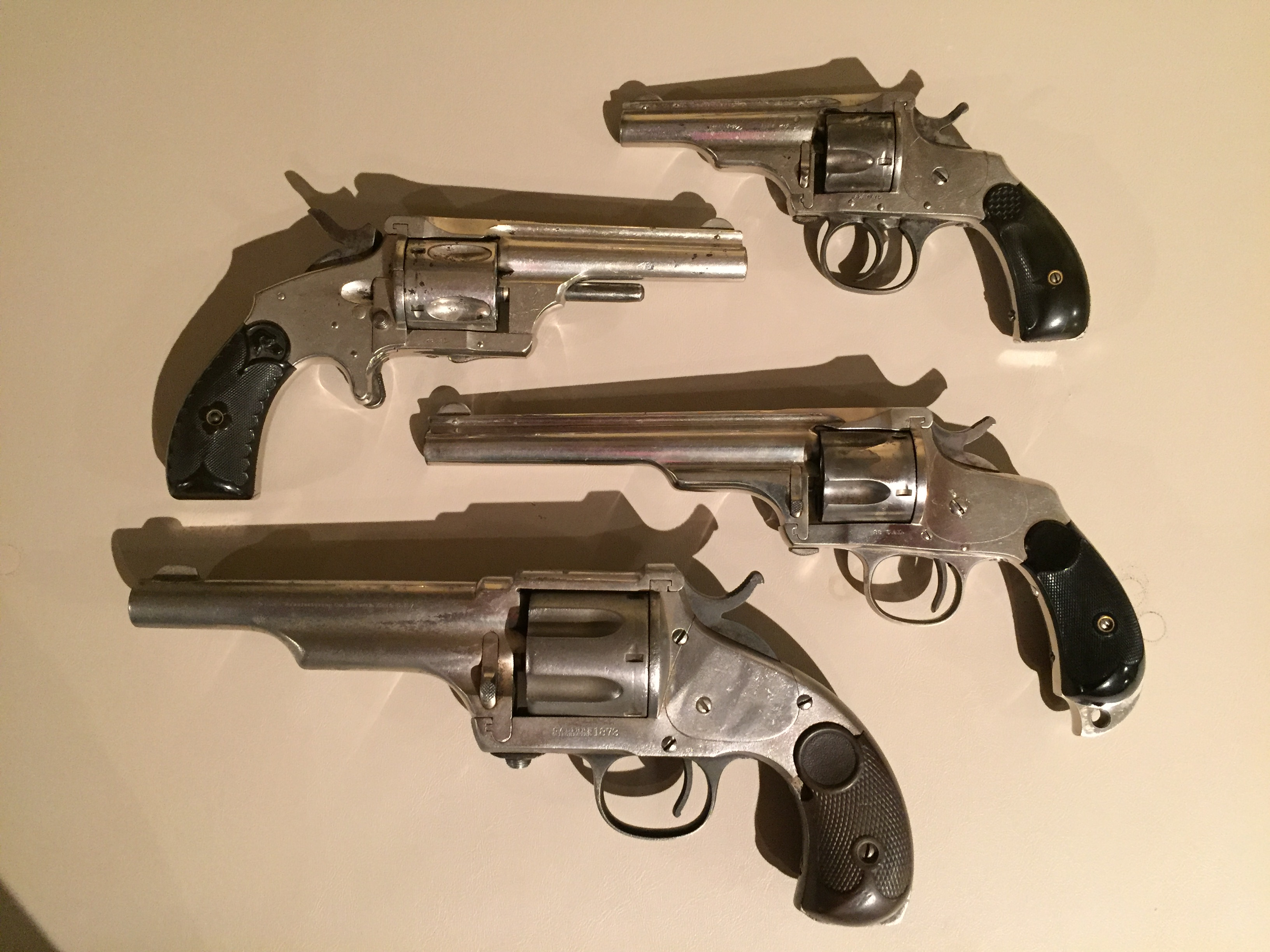
Family of revolver models - Small Pocket, Pocket & Frontier

The more prolific models all shared the same extraction and breakdown system, giving a strong family resemblance across the range. Merwin & Hulbert manufactured both single-action and double-action revolvers in three frame sizes - the Frontier/Pocket Army, the Pocket, and the Small Pocket. The Frontier frame was built around two design features - six shots and .44 caliber. Merwin Hulbert created this family to directly compete with the Colt Model 1873 Single-Action Army (a.k.a. Peacemaker), Remington Model 1875, and Smith & Wesson Model 3 as a large frame, big bore six-shooter. Though contracts with the US Army Ordnance Department were not forthcoming, significant sales were made to Russia. The pocket model was designed for a five-shot cylinder in .38 caliber. Finally, there is the 'small frame' pocket, a late addition to the lineup based around a five-shot, .32 caliber capability.

The outlier is the 'Baby Merwin', which shared none of the design features described. It was a seven-shot .22 rimfire revolver which is nearly identical to the Smith & Wesson Model 1.

=== Frontier Model ===
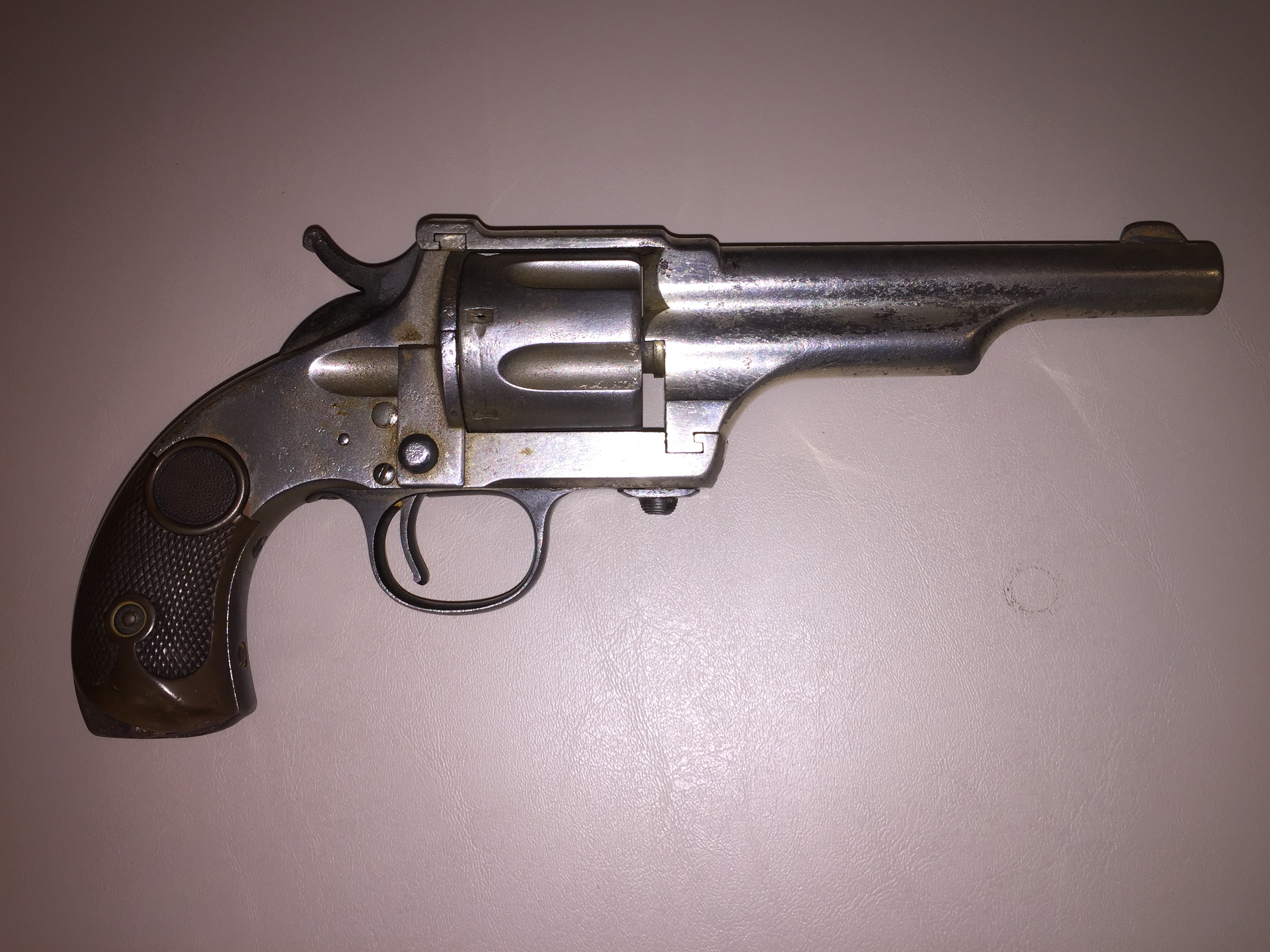
Frontier revolver, 3rd Model

Beginning in 1876, the Frontier was produced in four variations. All featured what is now considered a "conventional" trigger and guard. Most were produced in a nickel finish. The Frontier was distinguished from the Pocket Army by sporting the familiar "saw handle" grip.

1st Model – The first model is single-action, identified by its "open top" design (no top strap over the cylinder), "scoop" flutes on the cylinder, and a barrel wedge to engage the enclosed cylinder pin. Standard barrel was 7 inches, including an integral front sight. Most were manufactured with hard rubber grips—though wood, pearl or ivory could be had for additional cost. The first caliber offered was the proprietary .44 Merwin & Hulbert (.44-30), which resembles the S&W .44 American, but is longer overall. Eyeing the lucrative contracts the Smith & Wesson enjoyed with Imperial Russia, this model was later produced in .44 Russian. Production began in 1876, and likely ended in or around 1878 with the introduction of the 2nd model.

2nd Model – Very similar to the 1st Model, the second model sported a shortened cylinder locking bolt. This eliminated the need for internal access via a side plate, which was eliminated. The trigger guard was made longer and deeper. Hunting for U.S. government contracts, there was the addition of a detent pin in the barrel release lever, which was recommended by the U.S. Ordnance Department. The introduction of the .44-40 Winchester caliber (a.k.a. Winchester 1873) was an attempt to capture the market of those who preferred the same cartridge for rifle and revolver, acknowledging the popularity of the Winchester rifles of the day. The revolvers in this caliber were engraved with "Calibre Winchester 1873". The .44-40 became by far the most popular caliber for the Frontier throughout the remainder of the series. Production of the 2nd model lasted from 1878 to 1882.

3rd Model – Retaining the general look of its predecessors, the 3rd model had significant changes. The first was the addition of a top strap over the cylinder, which added to the strength of the design. The same mechanism for extracting cartridges was retained. The barrel wedge was eliminated as an unnecessary feature. The scoop flutes were replaced with the more common 3/4 length flutes for a slight weight savings. The 3rd model could be had in either single-action or double-action. A folding hammer spur was available for those who wished to avoid snagging clothing while drawing the weapon. One could purchase a 3rd model Frontier with a shorter 5 inch barrel if desired. The 3rd model was produced between 1883 and 1887.

4th Model – The fourth and final model of Frontier began production in 1887. The primary changes from the 3rd model was the addition of a rib atop the barrel. For the first time, the front sight was a separate component from the barrel, held by a retaining pin. Also for the first time, the Frontier was offered with barrel lengths of 3 1/2 or 5 1/2 inches in addition to the "traditional" 7 inch length. Multiple barrels could be purchased and easily swapped out by the owner without tools.

=== Pocket Army ===
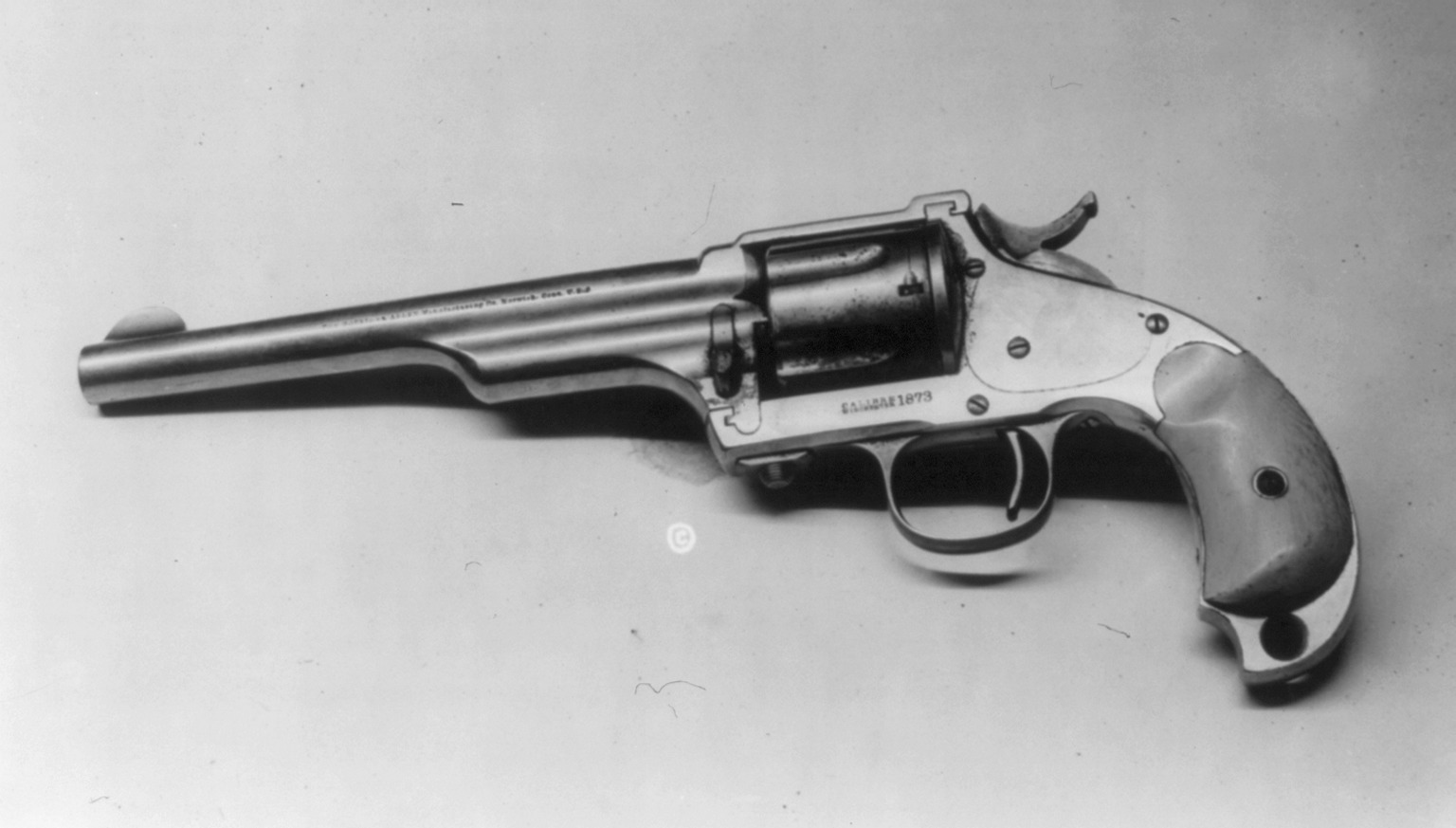
Jesse James' 44 caliber Merwin Hulbert Revolver made by Hopkins & Allen

The Pocket Army had three variants starting with the '2nd Model'. Author Art Phelps established the nomenclature for the Merwin and Hulbert revolver variants, and since the features of the 1st Pocket Army closely aligned to the '2nd Model' Frontier, '2nd Model Pocket Army' was used. This has since become the accepted convention. The Pocket Army featured six-shot cylinders like the Frontier model, and was produced in .44 M&H, .44 Russian, and by far the most popular: .44-40 Winchester caliber. The primary distinction between the Pocket Army and the Frontier is that the Pocket Army sports a 'bird's head' grip, similar in contour to the famous Bisley target grips found on some Colt models. The innovation here is an exposed metal from that includes an integral lanyard loop. If in a hand-to-hand melee situation, the grip was quite an effective club. In fact, the grip was commonly referred to as the 'skull crusher'. Having handled a large frame Merwin Hulbert, the author finds no difficulty believing that this is a literal claim. Many will find it odd that a 'Pocket Army' could be had with a seven-inch barrel - hardly pocket size, even in an overcoat! The fact is that many of the Pocket Army would have been holster-carried in the field. Additionally, multiple barrels could be purchased in different lengths to allow one weapon to serve both in the field and in town.

2nd Model – With similar features to the 2nd Model Frontier, the 2nd Model Pocket Army featured an 'open top' frame. Both 3 1/2 inch and 7 inch barrels could be purchased, with the customer able to purchase both. Barrels were easily changed by the owner without tools, offering a 'two-guns in one' advantage over the competition, with the shorter barrel giving the owner a concealable firearm for in town, and a longer barrel for the field. Distinctive to the Pocket Army was the birds-head grip, also known as the 'skull-crusher' due to the protruding steel bottom of the grip. The 2nd Model was produced approximately 1880–1883.

3rd Model – Features progressed for the 3rd Model similar to the progression of the Frontier Model, with the added top strap, 3/4 length cylinder flutes, elimination of the barrel wedge, and optional folding hammer spur. The 3rd model could be had in both single-action and double-action, and was produced between 1883 and 1887.

4th Model – Also following the design cues of the Frontier, the 4th Model Pocket added a rib atop the barrel with separate sight. The 5 1/2 inch barrel was introduced, and the 3 1/2 and 7 inch barrels are rare on the 4th model. Production began in 1887.

=== Pocket Model ===
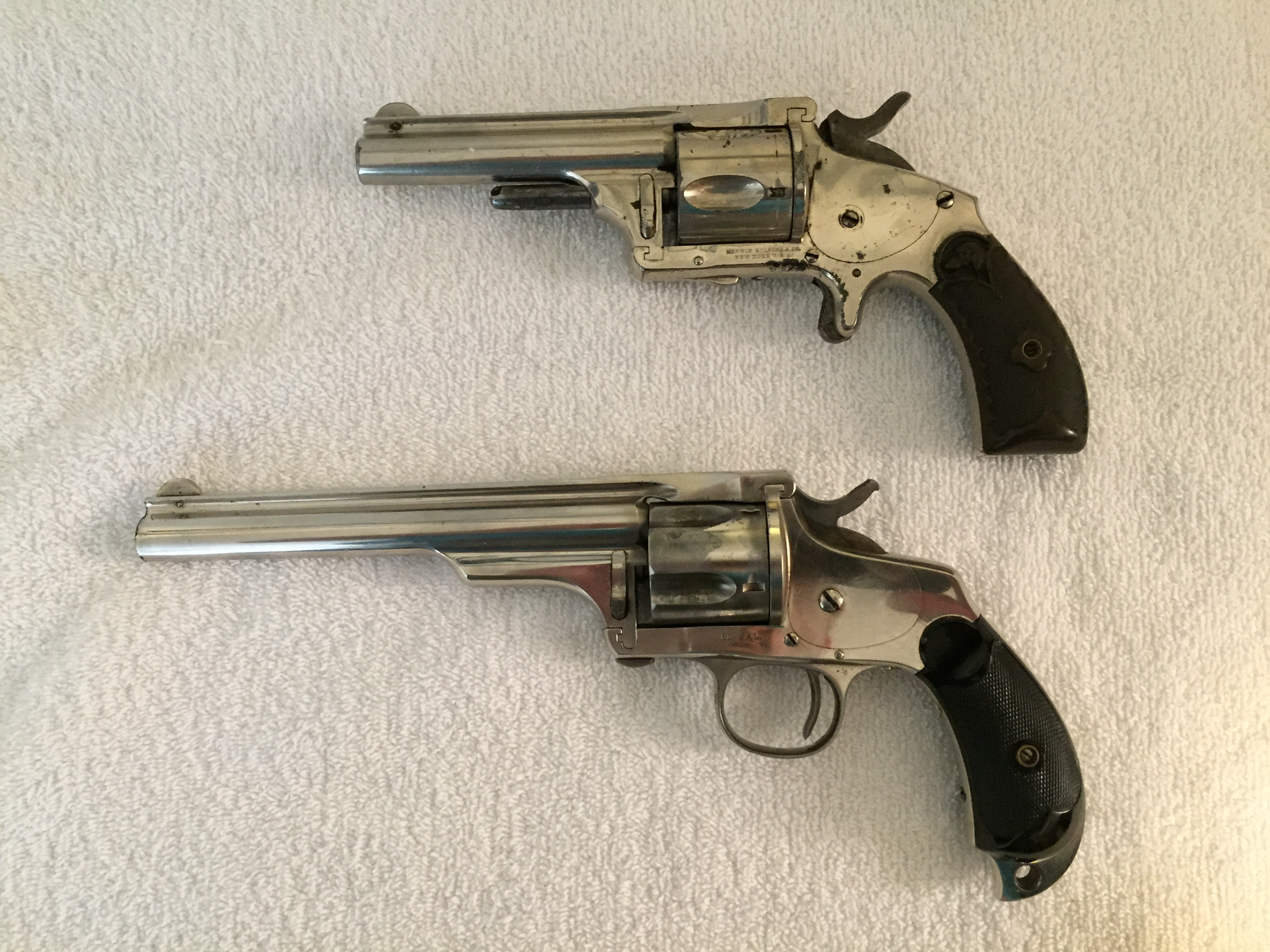
2nd and 4th Model Pocket revolvers

The Pocket Model was created for the urban market. Even on the frontier, it was more usual for someone to carry a pistol in a coat pocket than a holster while in town. Of course by today's standards, these 'pocket' sized pistols would be considered full size. The author owns an example with a 5-inch barrel. Apparently, pockets were quite large in the fashions of the day. The Pocket Model went through an interesting evolution of features. Barrel length was typically between 3 1/2 and 5 1/2 inches long, though a few early specimens sported a 2 3/4 inch barrel. All have the frame top strap over the cylinder for added strength.

1st Model – The first model is single-action, five-shot revolver in .38 Merwin and Hulbert (very similar to the .38 S&W cartridge). All were nickel plated, and it features a spur trigger and exposed cylinder pin. There is no loading gate, just material cut out of the frame and shield. The cylinder has scoop flutes. The grip is the familiar 'saw handle' style, typically made of hard rubber, though pearl and ivory were available for an addition cost.

2nd Model – The only change for the second model is the addition of a rearward sliding loading gate.

3rd Model – The third model has an easy to identify look different from the first two models. The cylinder pin has now been enclosed. The spur trigger is retained, making all 3rd Models single action like their predecessors. Although aesthetically pleasing, the practical reason for the design change to avoid snagging on the pocket on drawing the weapon. The 3rd Model also introduced a smaller version of the 'skull-crusher' grip as an option.

4th Model – The fourth model replaces the spur trigger with a familiar style trigger with trigger guard. The fourth model could be had in single or double action, and there was the option of a folder hammer spur. Two barrel sets are rare, but would typically consist of one each 2 3/4 inch and 5 1/2 inch barrels. A 'target' variant was sold in .32 long caliber with a seven-shot cylinder in addition to the more usual five-shot .38 M&H configuration.

=== Small Frame Pocket Model ===
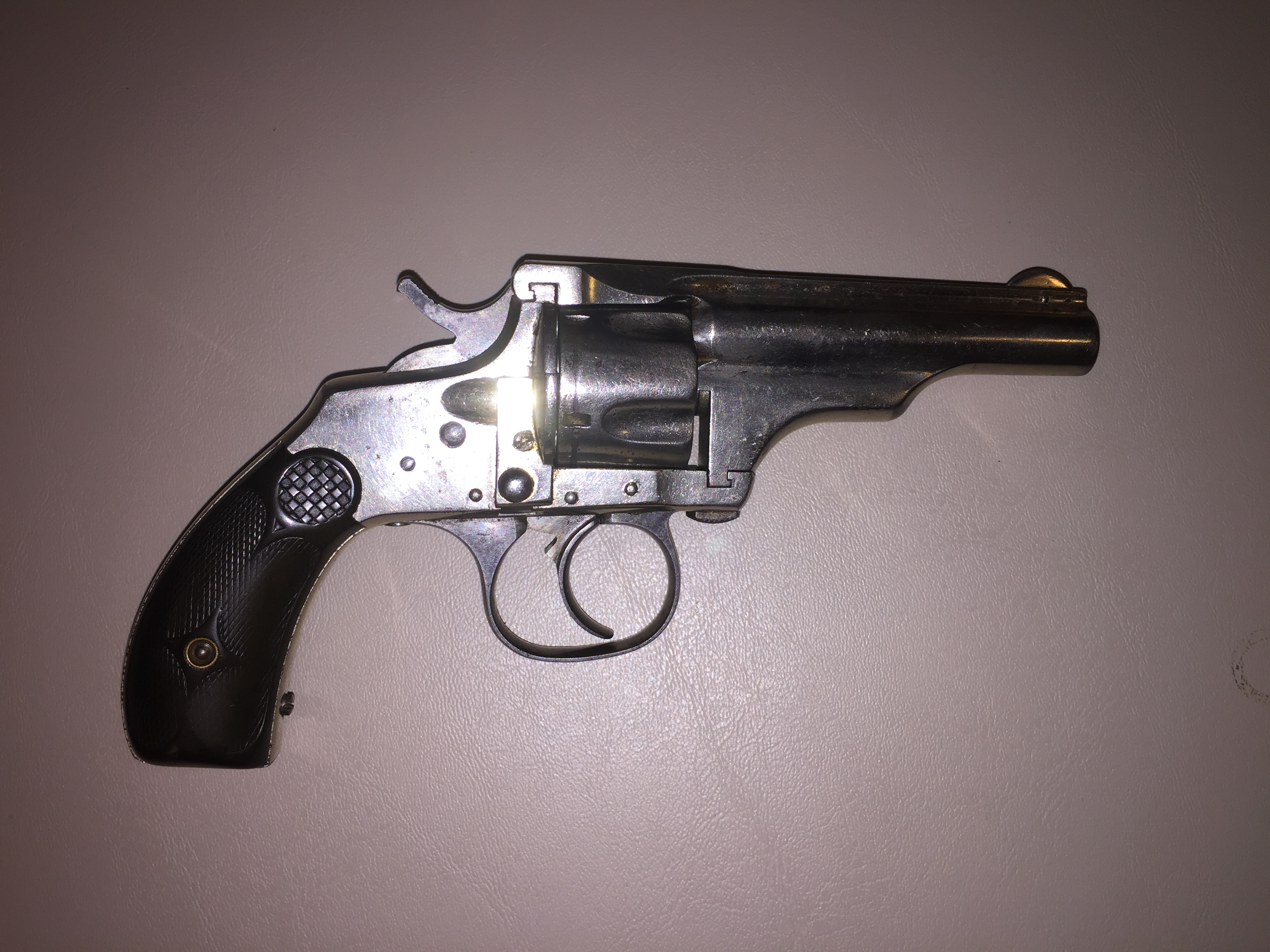
Small Frame Pocket Model

For those wishing a smaller and lighter package, a smaller double-action pocket model was produced. On a smaller frame than the 'Pocket' model, this sported a five-shot cylinder in .32 M&H caliber. With features similar to the 4th Model Pocket, both single and double action were available with or without the folder hammer spur. Only the saw handle grip was available, and 3 inch was the most common barrel length. This nifty little revolver must certainly have been more comfortable for 'every day carry' than its larger brother. While some may dismiss smaller calibers, one must remember that in the day smaller calibers were feared. Typically, clothing would be somewhat dirty. As slow bullets passed through into the body, some of this clothing would be carried into the wound with any number of nasty bacteria - opening the way to infection. Combining this with the primitive, and often distant or even absent medical attention, dying from an infection was a real possibility. Consequently, the lowly .32 caliber was not dismissed as ineffective, as it is considered today.

=== Baby Merwin ===
For a period of time, Merwin and Hulbert produced a design copy of the Smith & Wesson Model 1, third issue revolver. This featured a seven-shot cylinder in .22 Short caliber with a spur trigger and the 'tip up' barrel. Following a successful design infringement lawsuit, Merwin and Hulbert were forced to pay a royalty to Smith and Wesson for each revolver previously sold. Existing stock had the Merwin and Hulbert markings obliterated and were surrendered to Smith and Wesson for disposal.
