= Protector Palm Pistol =

19th century compact pistol

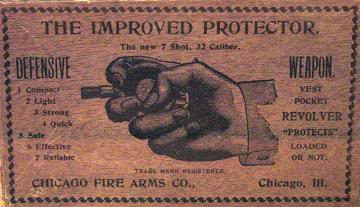
- Place of origin: France

Production history
- Designer: Jacques E. Turbiaux
- Designed: 1882
- Manufacturer: Systeme E. Turbiaux, Chicago Fire Arms Co. Minneapolis Firearms Co. Ames Sword Company
- Produced: 1882
- No. built: 3,000 Minneapolis Firearms Co., 12,800 Chicago Firearms Co./Ames Sword Company

Specifications
- Cartridge: .32 Extra Short
- Caliber: .32 (8 mm)
- Feed system: 7 or 8-round revolving magazine
- Sights: none

The Protector Palm Pistol is a small revolver designed to be concealed in the palm of the hand. It was unique in that the revolver was clasped in a fist with the barrel protruding between two fingers and the entire handgun was squeezed in order to fire a round. The design was meant to resemble a pocket watch to the extent of being carried on a chain.

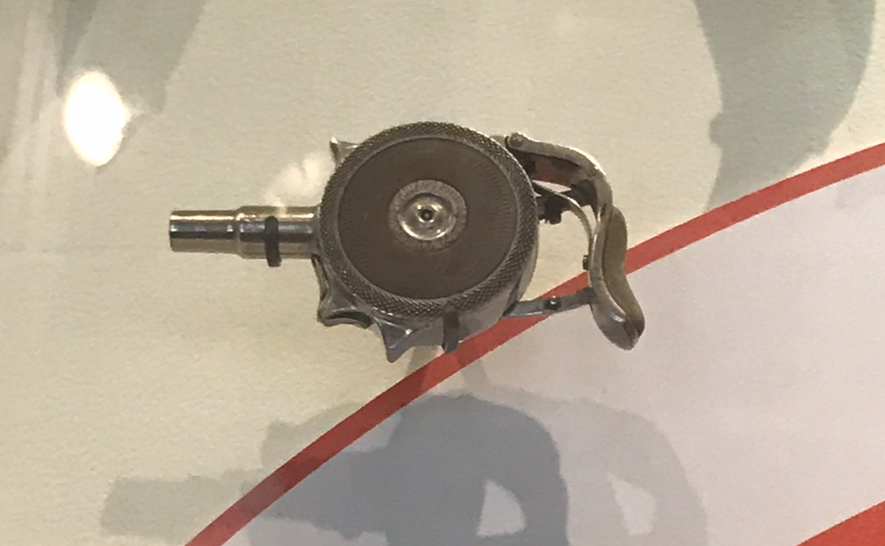
Protector Palm Pistol on display in Grand Rapids Public Museum

== History ==
The Protector Palm Pistol was first patented and built in France in 1882 by Jacques Turbiaux and sold as the "Turbiaux Le Protector" or the "Turbiaux Disc Pistol". Later in 1883 it was built in the USA as The Protector by Minneapolis Firearms Co. Peter H. Finnegan of Austin, Illinois bought the patent in 1892 and founded the Chicago Fire Arms Co. to make and market the pistols. In anticipation of the World's Columbian Exposition in 1893, he contracted the Ames Sword Company of Chicopee, Massachusetts to manufacture 15,000 pistols. Ames made 1,500 of the pistols by the deadline of the exhibition. Finnegan sued for damages and engaged in a lawsuit with Ames. The company countersued and settled with Finnegan, but, through the years, had amassed a large production run of 12,800 pistols. The company sold the inventory and abandoned the design by 1910.

Remington manufactured the rimfire ammunition for this pistol, 32 Extra Short and alternatively 32 Protector, until 1920.

Most Protectors were nickel-plated to prevent corrosion from being carried in close contact with the owner. These guns were shipped with hard rubber inserts for additional protection. Some varieties came with pearl inlays and a small percentage were blued.

== Operation ==
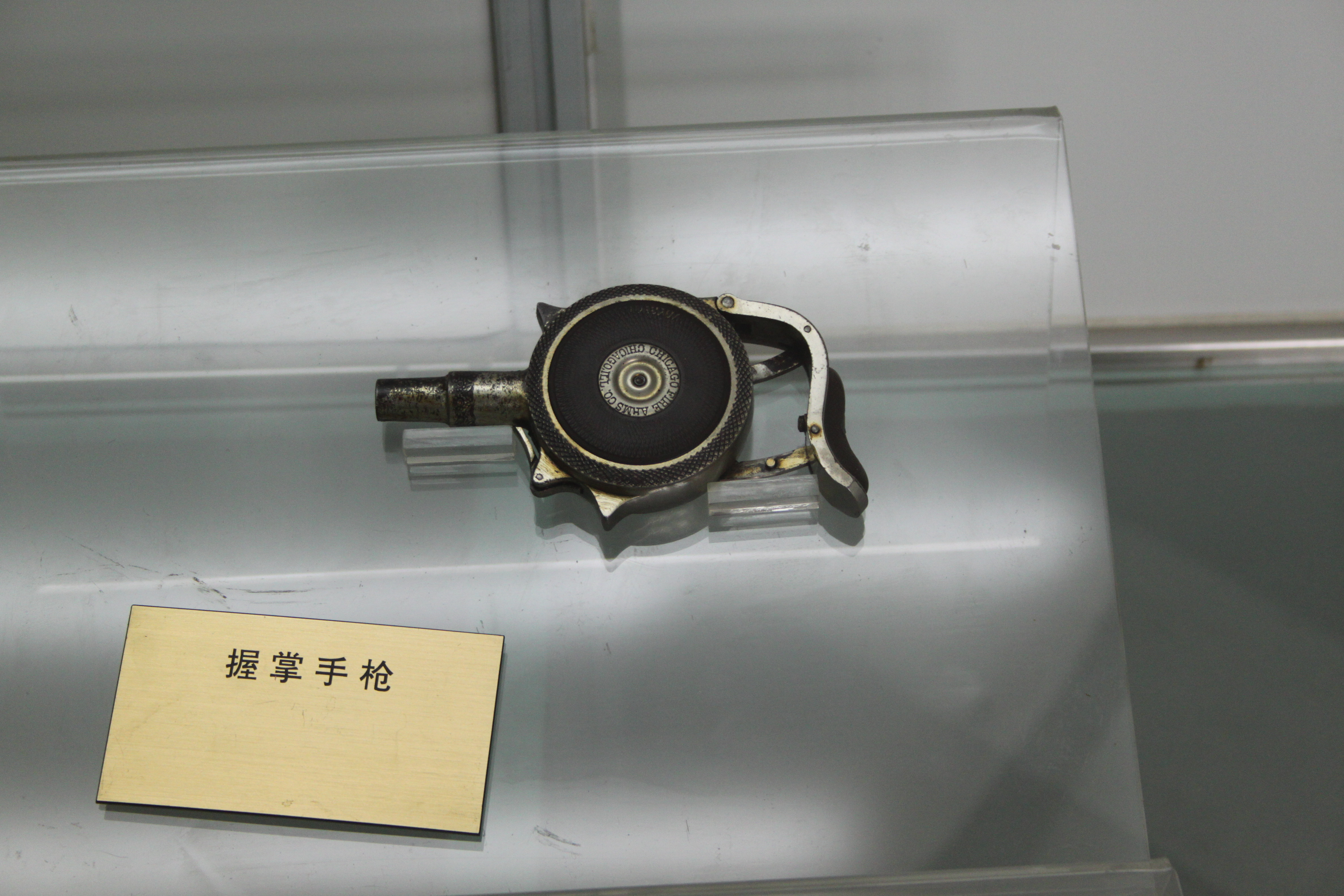
Protector made by Chicago Fire Arms at display in the Chinese military museum.

The design of these pistols was based on that patented by Jacques E. Turbiaux of Paris. Turbiaux described his pistol as "a revolver which may be held in the hand with no part exposed except the barrel". The protector was designed to be the size of a pocketwatch and is a unique pistol in that it is not fired using a conventional trigger, but by the operator squeezing their fist when the pistol is in the hand.

The guns were made in a few different calibres. Surviving examples have been noted in 6 mm, 8 mm, and .32 caliber. 6 mm is marked on some surviving boxes of the French version, and .32 caliber is noted on the boxes of the Chicago Fire Arms Co. pistols. The European and American versions used different designs of safety catches with the European pistols having two different versions of their sliding bar safety.

== See also ==
- Palm Pistol
- Shattuck Unique Palm Pistol
- Llama Pressin, Spanish design from the 1980s
- Nigiri-teppō, medieval Japanese design
- Sedgley OSS .38
- NRS-2
