= Smith & Wesson Model 1 =

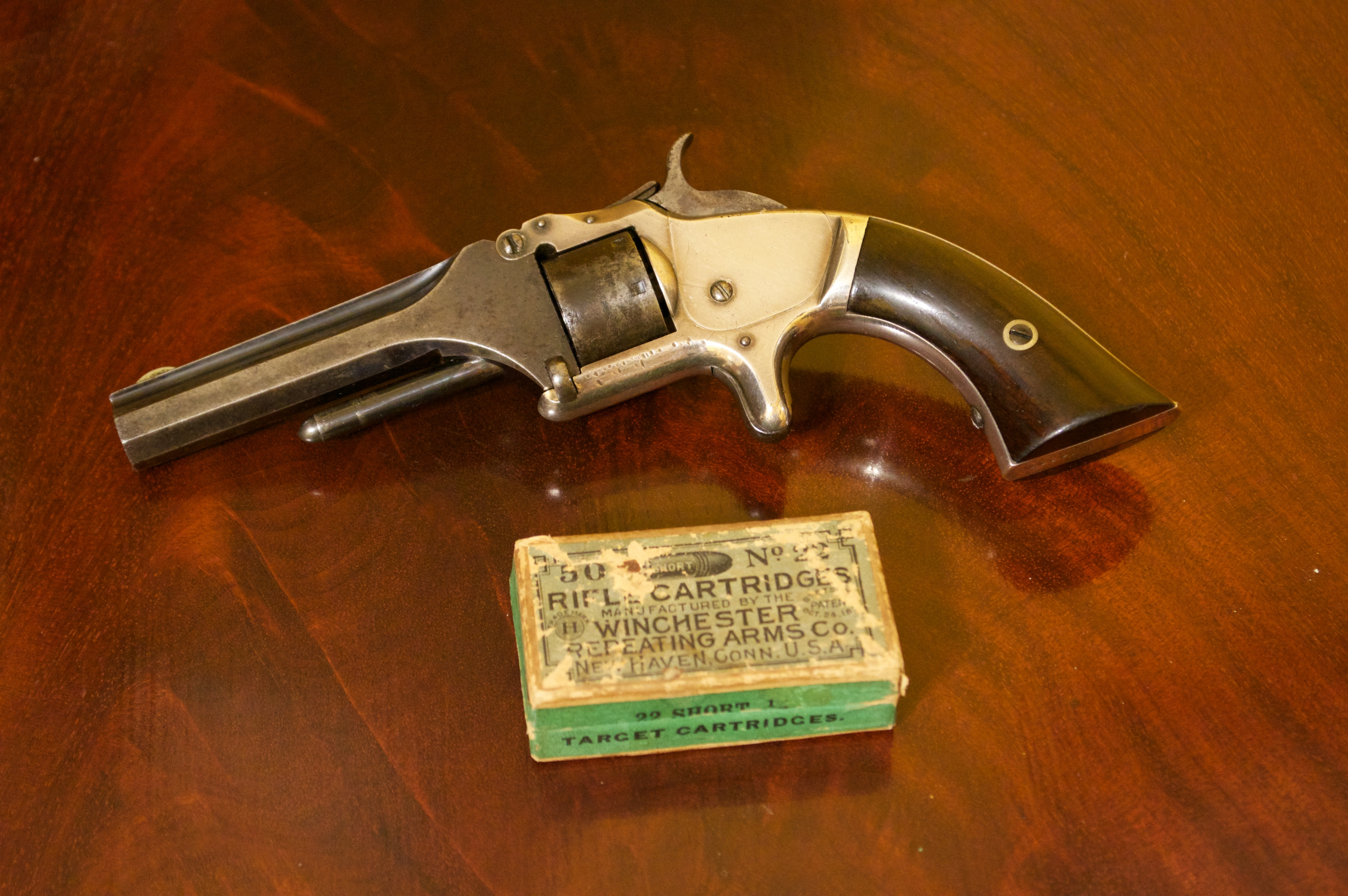
- A Smith & Wesson Model 1, 2nd Issue. This is a two patent date variety shown next to a period box of .22 short black powder cartridges.
- Type: Revolver
- Place of origin: United States

Service history
- In service: 1861–1865
- Used by: United States; Confederate States of America
- Wars: American Civil War

Production history
- Manufacturer: Smith & Wesson
- Produced: 1857–1882
- No. built: Approx. 12,000 (1st Issue), 110,000 (2nd Issue), 131,000 (3rd Issue)

Specifications
- Caliber: .22 Short Blackpowder
- Action: Single-action
- Feed system: 7-round cylinder
- Sights: Fixed

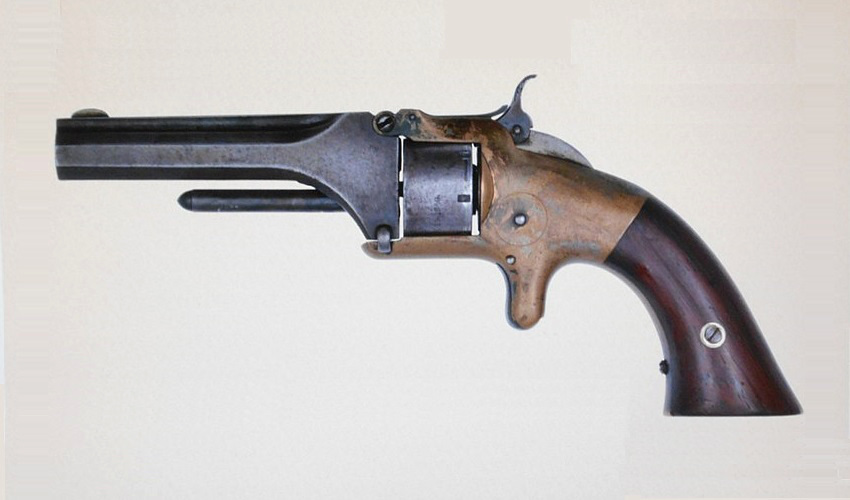
Smith & Wesson First Model, First Issue 1859

The Smith & Wesson Model 1 was the first firearm manufactured by Smith & Wesson, with production spanning from 1857 to 1882. It was the first commercially successful revolver to use rimfire cartridges instead of loose powder, musket ball, and percussion caps. It is a single-action, tip-up revolver holding seven .22 Short black powder cartridges.

== History ==
=== Early history ===
As Samuel Colt's patent on the revolver was set to expire in 1856, Horace Smith and Daniel B. Wesson were researching a prototype for a metallic cartridge revolver. When they discovered that a former Colt employee named Rollin White held the patent for a "Bored-through" cylinder, a component needed for this new invention, the two partners approached White to manufacture a newly designed revolver-and-cartridge combination.

Rather than make White a partner in their company, Smith and Wesson paid him a royalty of $0.25 on every "Model 1" revolver that they made. It would become White's responsibility to defend his patent in any court cases, which eventually led to his financial ruin but was very advantageous for the new Smith & Wesson Company.

== Variants ==
The Model 1 had three issues or major variants, with each subsequent issue introducing significant technical changes.

=== 1st Issue ===
The 1st Issue of the Model 1 was the first major iteration (and the least common), with approximately 12,000 produced over a three-year period. The features that easily distinguish the 1st issue are the flared, square cornered shaped grip (also seen in the 2nd Issue), the small round side plate, the round profile of the frame between the back of the cylinder and the grip, a split articulated hammer, and the flat spring barrel latch seen in some early variants.

There are six known variations (or types) of the first issue Model 1, identified in an article by John Kountz in the April 1956 issue of "The Gun Report". In this article, Kountz noted specific differences in the recoil shield (that rotated through type 5), the barrel latch (the first two types used a dart style flat spring catch, while later types and issues used a larger spring loaded bayonet release), the rifling and other subtle differences.

Serial numbers were issued sequentially for the Model 1 1st Issues ranging from 1 through approximately 12,000.

=== 2nd Issue ===
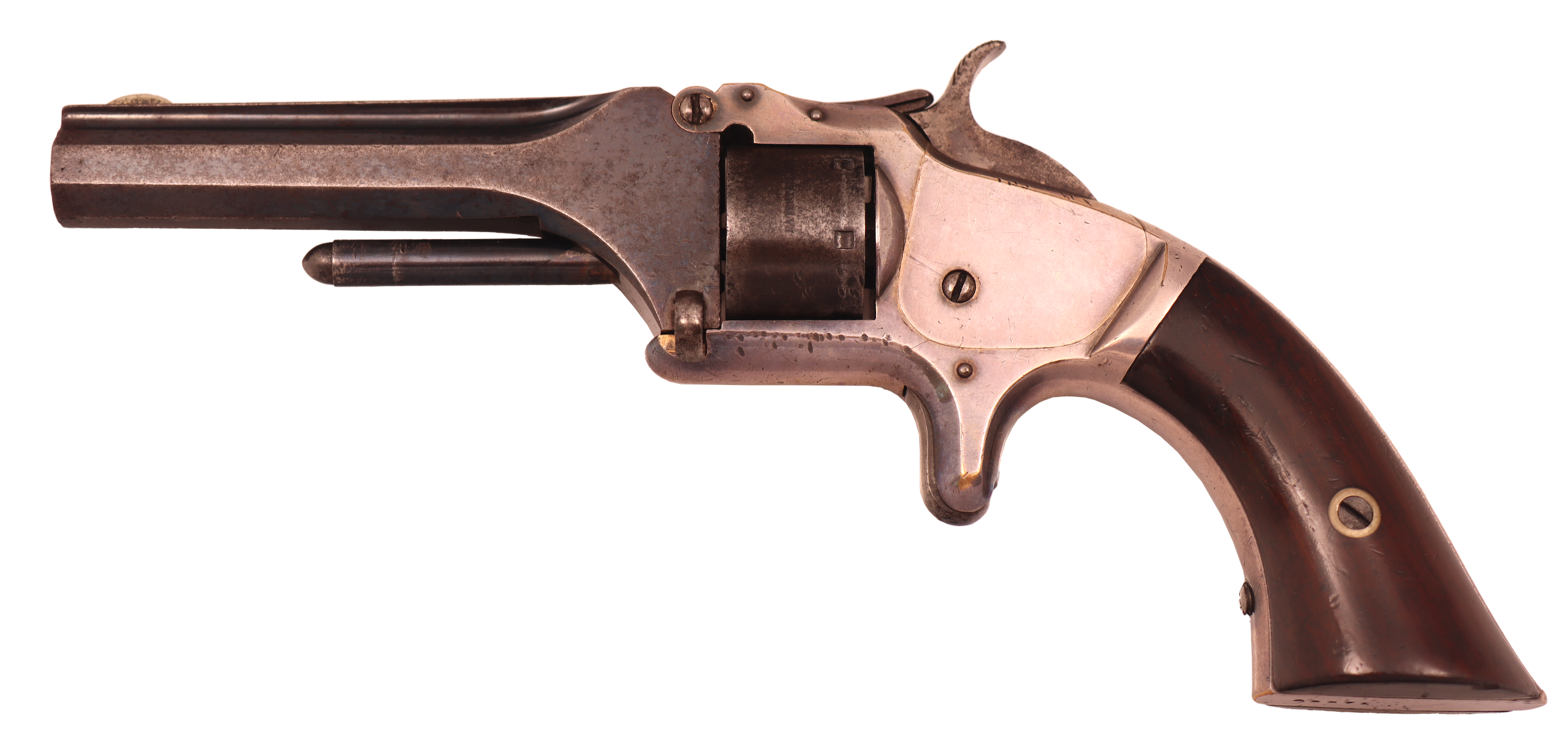
An example of the Smith & Wesson Model 1, 2nd Issue from December 1860.

The 2nd Issue of the Model 1 looks similar to the 1st Issue, with several notable differences. The side plate on the 2nd Issue is much larger and irregularly shaped. The profile of the frame is flatter (a likely concession for manufacturing efficiency), and the hammer is one piece. Model 1 2nd Issues retain the flared, square cornered shaped grip and the octagonal tip-up style frame, and at first glance the two issues are easy to confuse.

There are several variations of the 2nd Issue guns. Variants between serial numbers 12,000 through to about 20,000 involve the shape of the side plate ("straight" or "round"), the design of the trigger spring (flat spring, V spring or coil spring), and the number of patent dates on the cylinder (two or three). There was also a decrease in the size of the barrel roll stamps at around serial number 95,000. 2nd Issue marked "2D QUAL'TY" are also seen occasionally.

There were approximately 110,000 2nd Issues produced from 1860 through 1868, with serial numbers ranging from approximately 12,000 (following the 1st Issue) through to approximately 120,000.

=== 3rd Issue ===
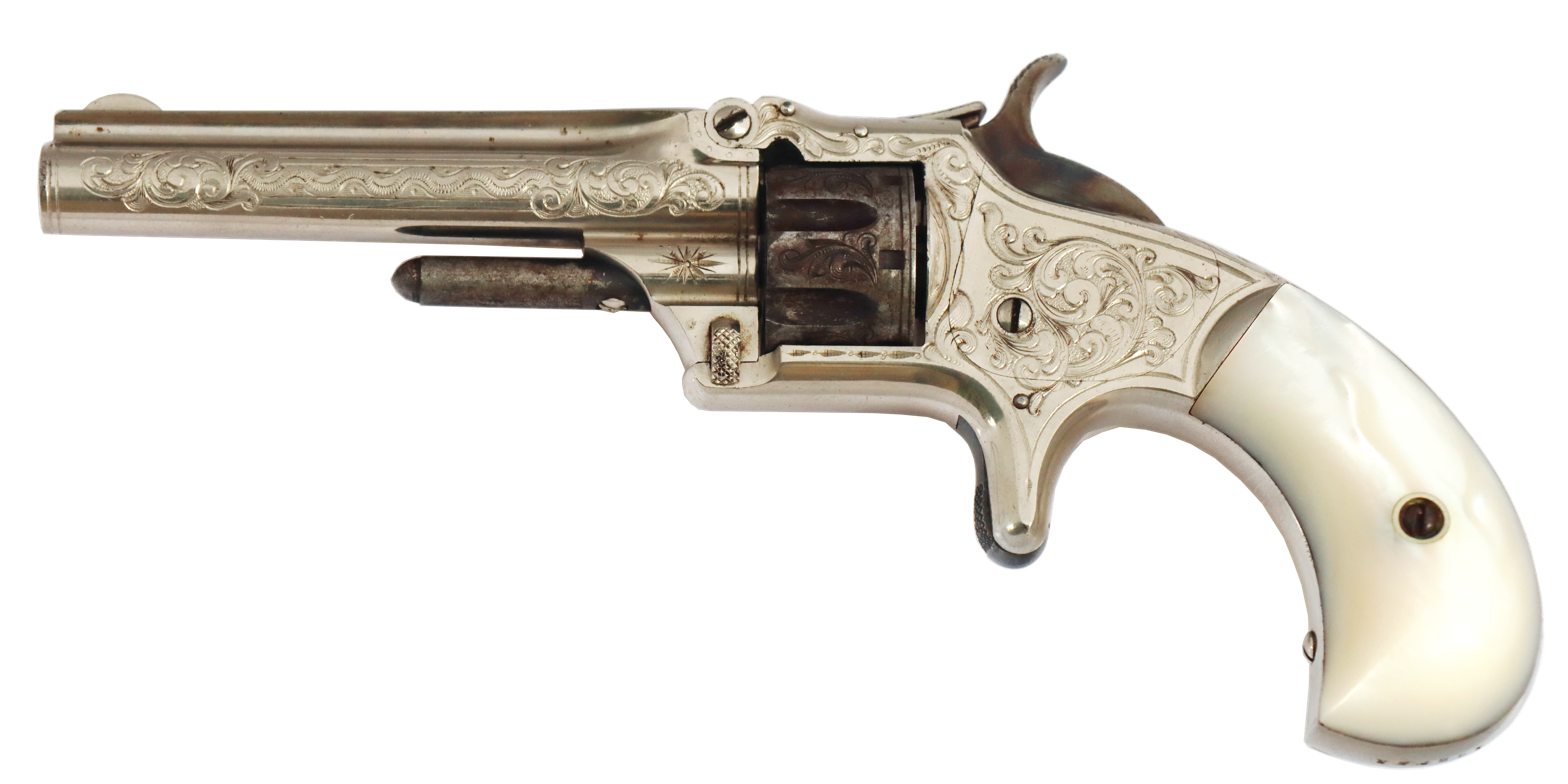
An engraved example of a Smith & Wesson Model 1, 3rd Issue revolver from 1877.

The Model 1, 3rd Issue represented a substantial redesign for the Model 1, with a fluted cylinder, a round barrel and a rounded "bird's head" style grip. Finishes included full nickel plating, full blued steel, and a "half plate" nickel/blue combo, and there were two barrel lengths offered by the factory. Variants include the "square" and "triangular" top strap design that changed around serial number 9,500. The 3rd Issue guns were produced from 1868 through 1882 with serial numbers from 1 through approximately 131,000.

== Popularity ==
The Model 1 was designed primarily as a concealable weapon for urbanites, at a time when cities were rapidly growing from the Industrial Revolution was outpacing that of municipal policing. Sales were brisk, and by 1859 orders for the Model 1 revolver outpaced the factory's production capabilities, and Smith & Wesson built a new three-story factory in 1859 to accommodate this demand. With the outbreak of the American Civil War, soldiers from all ranks on both sides of the conflict made private purchases of the revolvers for self-defense, which further contributed to demand for the Model 1.

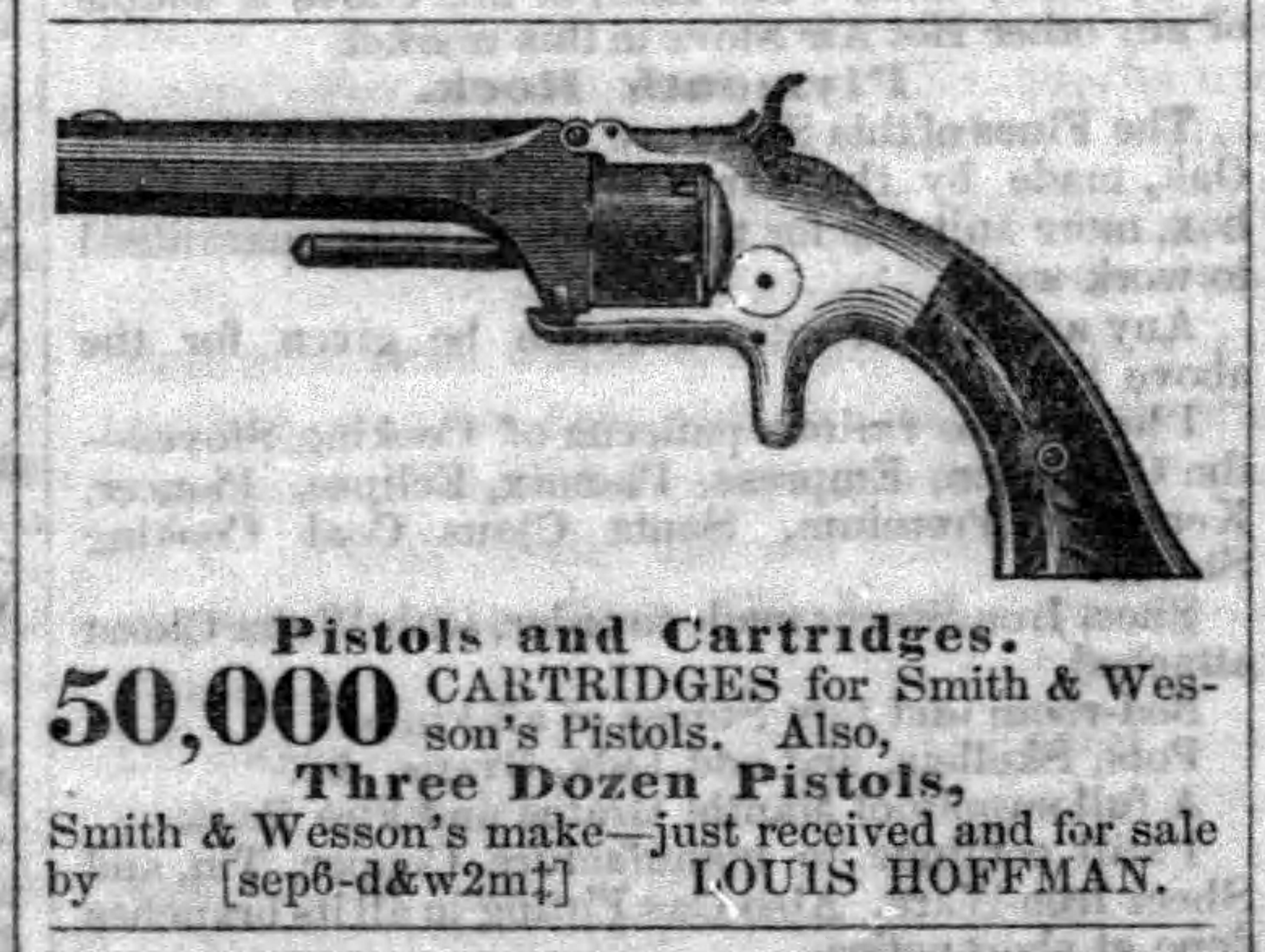
1859 Advertisement for S&W Model 1 Revolver

This popularity led to numerous knockoffs and patent infringements by other arms makers. Rollin White and S&W brought infringement cases against Manhattan Firearms Company, Ethan Allen, Merwin & Bray, National Arms Company and others. The courts mostly allowed these manufacturers to continue production runs, with a royalty on each revolver paid to White. In some cases, Smith & Wesson bought the revolvers back to remark and sell; these are marked "APRIL 3 1855" as a patent date.
