= FAMAE revolver =

FT-2000
- Type: Revolver
- Place of origin: Chile

Service history
- Used by: Chilean armed forces and Gendarmerie

Production history
- Manufacturer: FAMAE
- Variants: Slightly smaller version in .32 Long Colt

Specifications
- Mass: 630g
- Barrel length: 101.6 mm (F38L), 63.5 mm (F38C)
- Cartridge: .32 Long Colt; .38 Special
- Action: Double-action
- Feed system: Six round cylinder
- Sights: blade front, frame notch rear

The FAMAE FT-2000 is a double-action, .38 Special, solid frame revolver produced in Chile. A slightly smaller variant is produced in .32 Long Colt.
