= Marlin Model Golden 39A =

Lever-action firearm

Marlin Model 39A
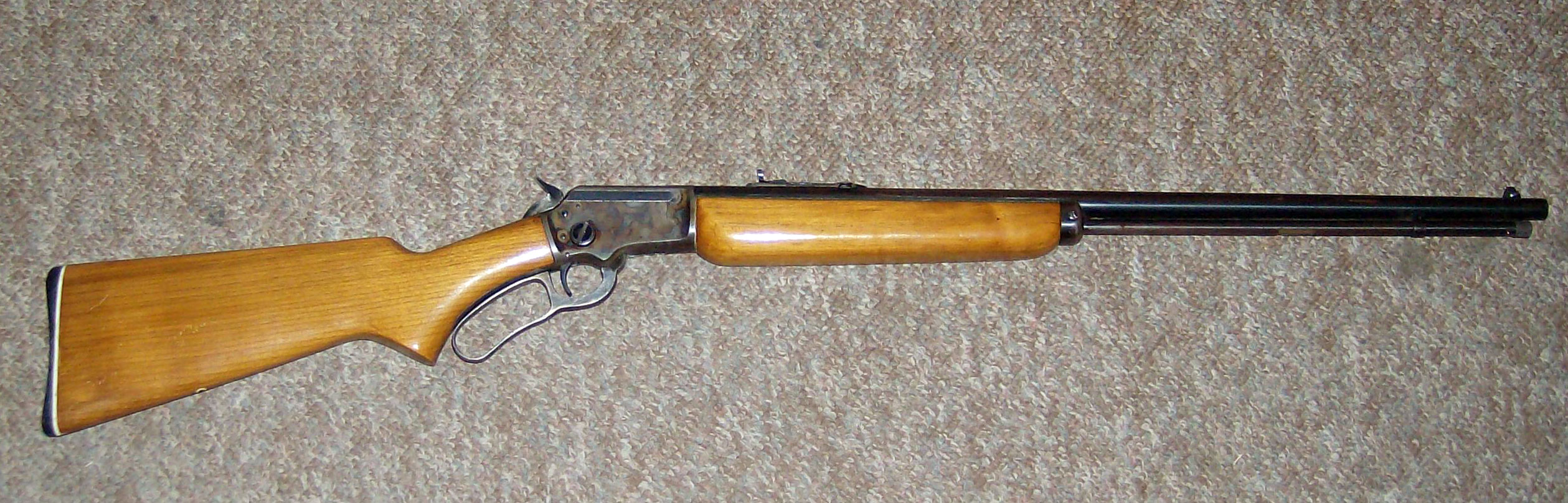
- This is a 39A from 1944 and thus does not have the cross-hammer safety or golden trigger seen on the current 39A.
- Type: Rifle
- Place of origin: United States

Service history
- In service: 1891–present

Production history
- Designer: Lewis L. Hepburn
- Designed: 1891
- No. built: 2.2 million (1922–2007)

Specifications
- Mass: 6.5 lbs
- Length: 40 in
- Barrel length: 24 in
- Cartridge: .22 Short, .22 Long, .22 Long Rifle
- Action: Lever action
- Muzzle velocity: 1,280 ft/s
- Feed system: Tubular magazine, 26 Short, 21 Long or 19 Long Rifle Cartridges.
- Sights: semi buckhorn rear sight, ramp front sight with brass bead and hood front sight

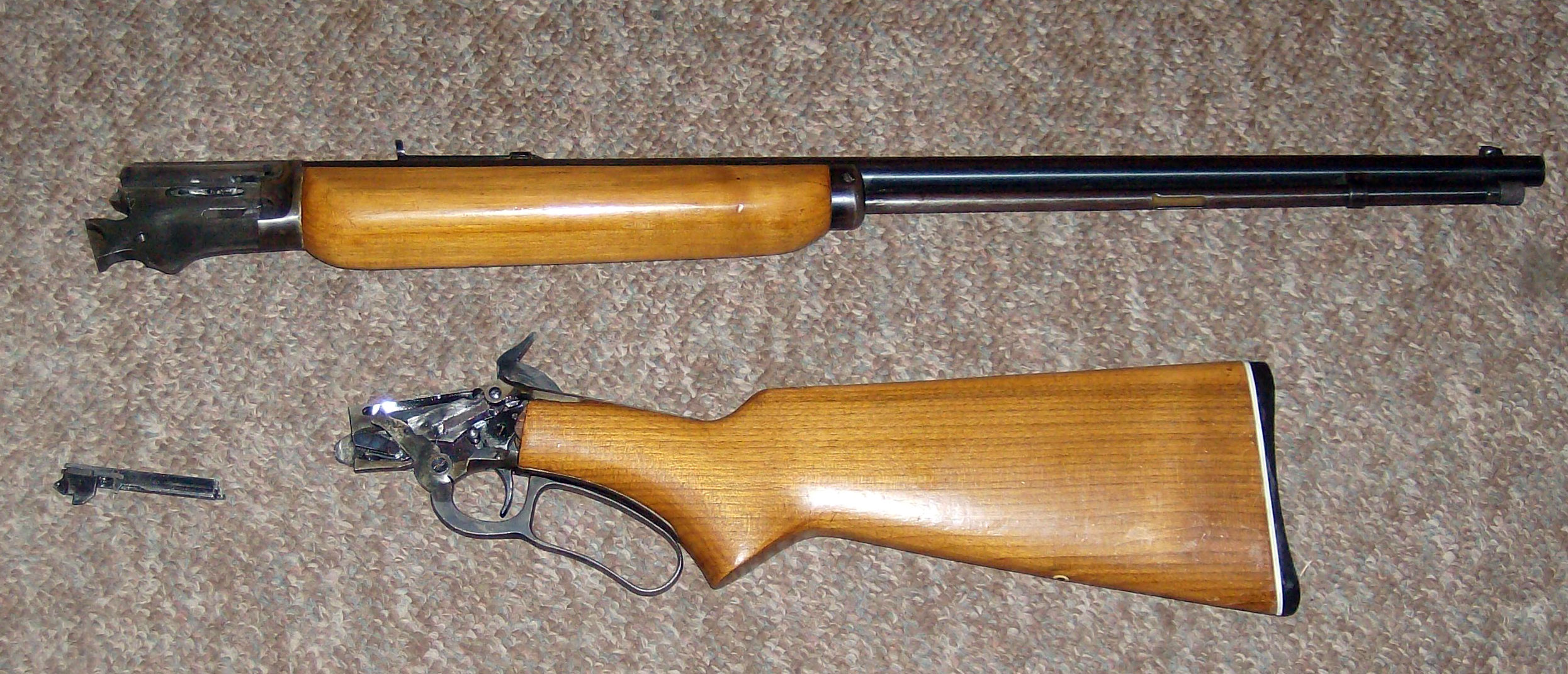
The same 39A taken down for cleaning.

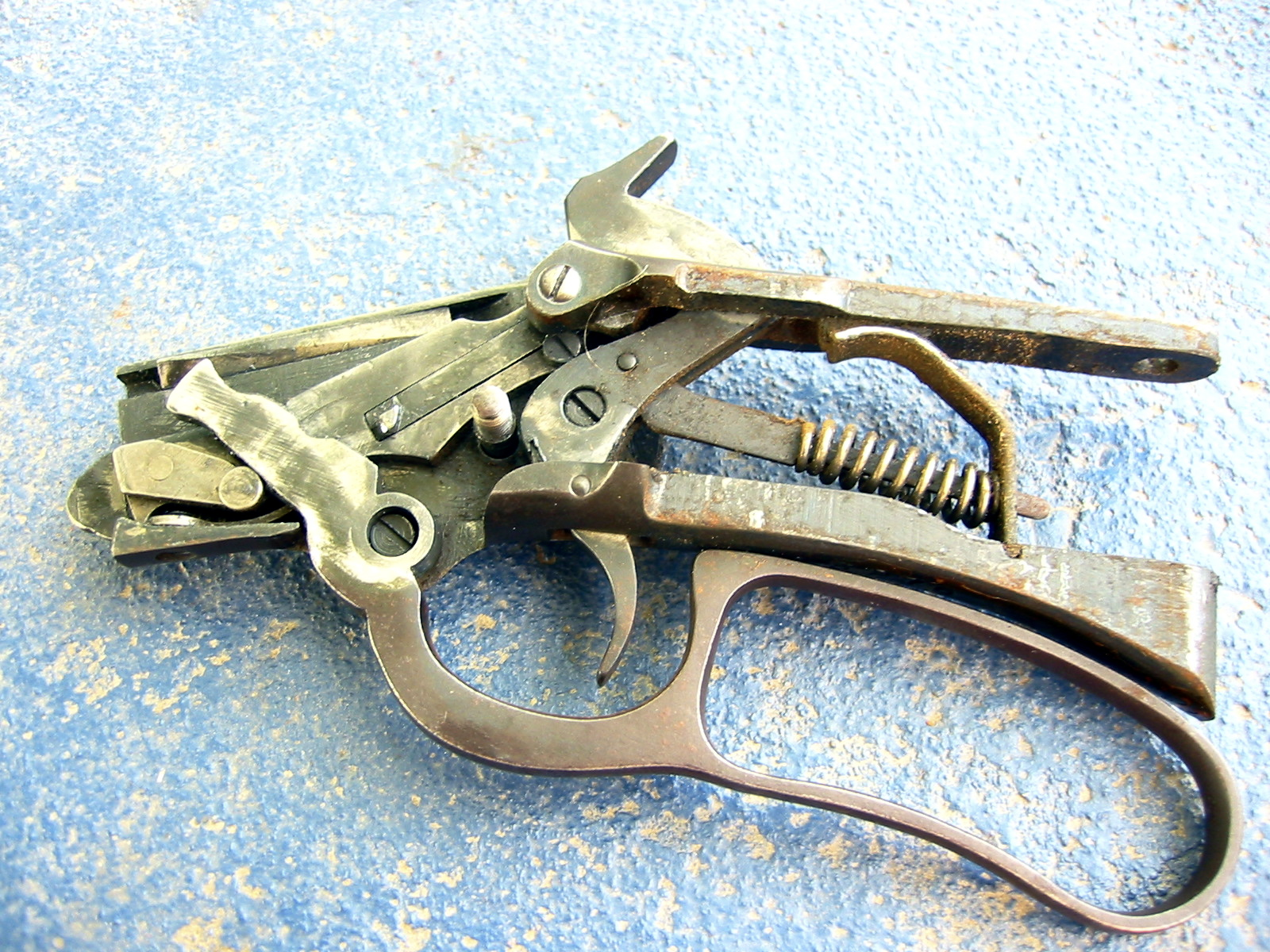
Inside of Marlin 39A receiver

The Marlin 39A is the oldest and longest continuously produced shoulder firearm in the world. The current variation gold trigger lever-action .22 Caliber Golden 39A is produced by the Marlin Firearms Co. of New Haven, Connecticut. The Golden 39A was last constructed in Remington’s Marlin factory in Ilion, NY. Production ended with the bankruptcy and closing of the Remington Marlin factory closing and sale to Ruger in September, 2020.

As of 2022, the 39A appears out of production. The Ruger company bought out the remaining Marlin production, but no new Marlin .22 cal rifles are currently available.

== History ==
The Golden Model 39A started life as the Marlin Model 1891, the first lever-action rifle ever chambered in .22LR and the magazine was loaded through a conventional side gate in the receiver. The tubular magazine was changed to front-loading with the Model 1892, due to the difficulties of receiver feeding the small rimfire round. The 1892 gave way to the takedown Model 1897, which became the Model 39 in 1921 and Model 39-A in 1939. The Golden Mountie Model 39A was introduced in 1954. The 39A was produced until 1983 when the current Golden 39A was introduced. Changes between models were so minimal the rifle is considered to have been continually produced to the same basic specifications for over 100 years. The Model 39-A did not have a cross hammer safety, whereas the current Golden Model 39A has had one since introduction in 1983. The Golden 39A is still considered one of the finest examples of a lever .22 rifle, and one of the most accurate .22 rifles ever produced. It is also the best-selling lever rimfire in U.S. history. Additionally "mountie" versions have been produced at various points in the rifle's life which featured a shorter 20" barrel and a straight stock. These rifles have been alternately called Model 39M or 1897 Mountie. The Mountie has a magazine capacity of 20 Short, 16 Long or 15 Long Rifle .22 cartridges.

Since 1954 Marlin has used their proprietary Micro-Groove rifling in the Model 39A. This rifling uses many small lands and grooves rather than 2, 4, or 6 deeper grooves used by the majority of rifle makers. The rifling is also made to a 1 in 16" right hand twist. The combination of these two factors arguably adds to the accuracy of the rifle and indeed the 39A's reputation would seem to bear this out.

The Model Golden 39A is built of forged steel parts and American grown black walnut. It is one of the very few remaining .22 rifles with easy takedown ability (it can be taken apart using a coin). The screw that allows the easy takedown, however, is frequently criticized as it disrupts the otherwise clean lines of the rifle. Further, in the event of a malfunction which prevents the breech from closing, takedown becomes impossible until the action can be cleared as the breech must be closed before takedown. The Model Golden 39A has a solid-top receiver and side ejection, which makes mounting a scope easy. One source claims that the signature gold trigger was discontinued in favor of a blued trigger between 1982 and 1985, but at least one "Original Golden 39A" from 1982 (SN 18260086) was made with the gold trigger, perhaps as a special order.

The Marlin Model Golden 39A is still commercially available with a 24" (61 cm) round barrel, a pistol grip, and a signature golden colored trigger. The Golden 39A has a full length steel tubular magazine under the barrel with a brass inner tube and a hammer block safety. Magazine capacity is as follows: 26 .22 Short, 21 .22 Long, or 19 .22 Long Rifle (total capacity is often cited as 27 Short, 22 Long or 20 Long Rifle counting a round preloaded in the firing chamber). Many previous variations of the model are still available from used gun dealers.

== Annie Oakley involvement ==
On March 10, 1893 Annie Oakley used a Model 1891 to put 25 shots through one jagged hole in 27 seconds at a distance of 36 feet (12 yds or 11 m) using 22 short cartridges. On the same day she also produced another jagged one-hole group through the center of an Ace of Hearts playing card, while shooting off-hand. Marlin has since made two "special runs" of Annie Oakley commemorative 39A rifles to honor Oakley's achievements and fame while using their brand. The first consisted of 500 39A rifles in 1998 which were offered to the general public with another 100 offered only to their employees. In 2000 another run of the special AO guns was made for Davidson's Gallery of Guns again offered to the general public.

== Similar guns ==
- Winchester Model 9422
- Henry Lever Action .22
- Browning BL-22
- Chiappa LA322
