= .32 rimfire =

Revolver cartridge

.32 Short Rimfire
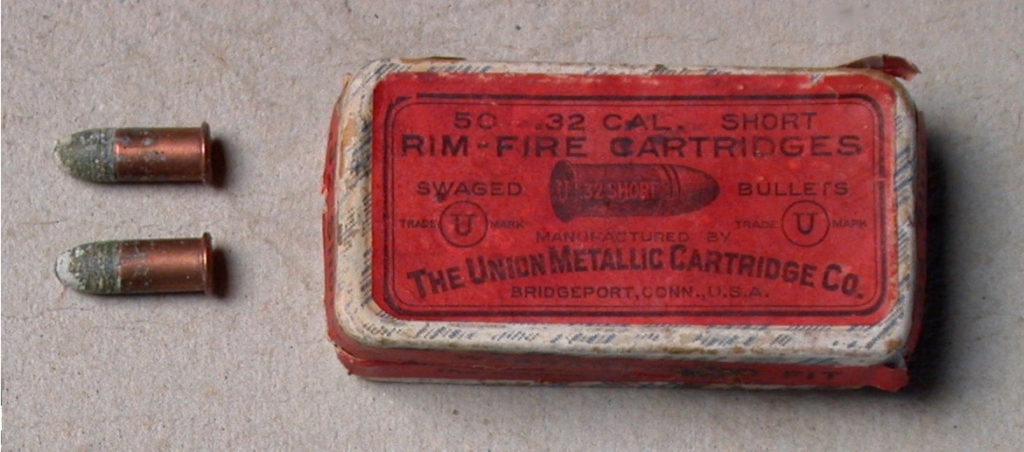
- Type: Rifle and handgun
- Place of origin: United States

Production history
- Designer: Smith & Wesson
- Designed: 1860

Specifications
- Case type: Rimmed, straight
- Bullet diameter: .316 in (8.0 mm)
- Neck diameter: .318 in (8.1 mm)
- Base diameter: .318 in (8.1 mm)
- Rim diameter: .377 in (9.6 mm)
- Case length: 0.575 in (14.6 mm)
- Overall length: 0.948 in (24.1 mm)
- Primer type: Rimfire
- Maximum pressure: 12,000 psi (82.74 MPa)

Ballistic performance
Bullet mass/type	Velocity	Energy
80 gr (5 g) Rimmed	945 ft/s (288 m/s)	159 ft⋅lbf (216 J)
- Test barrel length: 24

.32 Long Rimfire
- Type: Pistol/Rifle
- Place of origin: United States

Production history
- Designer: Smith & Wesson
- Designed: 1860

Specifications
- Case type: Rimmed, straight
- Bullet diameter: .316 in (8.0 mm)
- Neck diameter: .318 in (8.1 mm)
- Base diameter: .318 in (8.1 mm)
- Rim diameter: .377 in (9.6 mm)
- Case length: 0.791 in (20.1 mm)
- Overall length: 01.26 in (32 mm)
- Primer type: Rimfire
- Maximum pressure: 13,000–14,000 psi (89.63–96.53 MPa)

Ballistic performance
Bullet mass/type	Velocity	Energy
90 gr (6 g) Rimmed	1,080 ft/s (330 m/s)	233 ft⋅lbf (316 J)
- Test barrel length: 24

.32 Extra Long
- Type: Pistol/Rifle
- Place of origin: United States

Specifications
- Case type: Rimmed, straight
- Bullet diameter: .316 in (8.0 mm)
- Neck diameter: .318 in (8.1 mm)
- Base diameter: .318 in (8.1 mm)
- Rim diameter: .377 in (9.6 mm)
- Case length: 1.150 in (29.2 mm)
- Overall length: 01.26 in (32 mm)
- Primer type: Rimfire
- Maximum pressure: 15,000 psi (103.42 MPa)

Ballistic performance
Bullet mass/type	Velocity	Energy
90 gr (6 g) Rimmed	1,050 ft/s (320 m/s)	221 ft⋅lbf (300 J)
- Test barrel length: 24

The .32 rimfire / 8x20mmRF refers to a family of cartridges which were chambered in revolvers and rifles in the late 19th and early 20th centuries. These rounds were made primarily in short and long lengths, but extra short, long rifle and extra long lengths were offered.

== Manufacturers ==
Manufacturers in the USA generally discontinued making.32 rimfire ammunition after the country's entrance into World War II in 1941. It was available from old stocks for some years afterwards, but it has been made only sporadically in the last 70 years. Occasionally, special limited runs of.32 rimfire ammunition are manufactured for gun collectors with shootable specimens, but the round is not considered a current commercial cartridge. Navy Arms Company had periodically imported.32 Rimfire Long made by CBC in Brazil until 2014.

== History ==
The .32 short was designed in 1860 by Smith & Wesson for their Model 2 revolver. In 1868, they introduced the .32 Long in the Model 1 1/2 Second Issue revolver.

The .32 Short fired an 80 gr (0.183 oz; 5.184 g) lead bullet at 945 ft/s (288 m/s) (generating 159 ft⋅lb (216 J) muzzle energy) from a 24 in (61 cm) rifle barrel. The .32 Long fired a slightly heavier 90 gr (0.206 oz; 5.832 g) bullet at approximately the same velocity, for 178 ft⋅lb (241 J) muzzle energy. Remington rifles in.32 rimfire listed a bore diameter of .304 in (7.7 mm)

The .32 Colt Short and Long centerfire cartridges matched the external dimensions of the .32 Short and Long rimfire cartridges. The Marlin Model 1892 lever-action repeating rifle was shipped with two firing pins, one rimfire and one centerfire, to allow use of either the rimfire or centerfire cartridges. Revolvers and single shot rifles chambered for one of the longer.32 rimfire cartridges would chamber and fire the shorter cartridges.

Remington Arms manufactured .32 Extra Short ammunition (also known as .32 Protector) until 1920 for use in the Protector Palm Pistol and Remington Magazine Pistol.

During its lifetime, the .32 rimfire was loaded with black powder, followed by semi-smokeless and smokeless powder loadings. While it was popular as a very effective small game caliber, it was considered obsolete by the late 1930s, in part due to the introduction of high-velocity versions of the .22 Long Rifle using smokeless powder.

== See also ==
- Hopkins & Allen
- American Civil War
- Table of handgun and rifle cartridges
