= Palm Pistol =

- Type: Single shot
- Place of origin: USA

Production history
- Designer: Matthew Carmel
- Manufacturer: Constitution Arms

The Palm Pistol is a pocket pistol invented by Matthew Carmel and manufactured by his company Constitution Arms in Maplewood, New Jersey. The firearm is specifically intended for use by seniors, disabled and others with limited hand strength or manual dexterity.

== Overview ==
The gun is intended to be a single-shot weapon held in the palm of the hand with the barrel extending between the fingers. The trigger would be at the top, squeezed by the user's thumb. Carmel stated, "I was sitting in my workshop one day, playing around with a T-handled screwdriver. And I was thinking about the recurring problem I have with the seniors I teach, loading cartridges, locking slides, and hand weakness… I was thinking minimalist. If I start with just a cartridge, what is the minimal thing I have to put around it in order to ignite the primer and send this projectile downrange?" The T-handled screwdriver made Carmel realize that all he needed was a barrel, a breech, and a short butt or handle.

== Classification ==
In 2008, while the gun was still in development, it was classified as a medical device by the FDA, which would have allowed reimbursements from Medicare if doctors had prescribed the pistol to eligible patients. The classification was overturned on December 8, 2008.

== See also ==
- Pocket pistol
- Protector Palm Pistol - 1800s era device of similar design and use
