= Forehand & Wadsworth =

U.S. firearms manufacturing company

- Company type: Firearms manufacturer
- Industry: Firearms
- Predecessor: Ethan Allen & Company
- Founded: 1871
- Fate: Acquired by Hopkins & Allen in 1902
- Headquarters: Worcester, Massachusetts, United States
- Key people: Sullivan Forehand, Henry C. Wadsworth
- Products: Derringers, revolvers. rifles, shotguns

Forehand & Wadsworth (later known as Forehand Arms) was an American firearms manufacturing company based in Worcester, Massachusetts. It was formed in 1871 by Sullivan Forehand and Henry C. Wadsworth after the death of their father-in-law, Ethan Allen of Ethan Allen & Company, and was acquired in 1902 by Hopkins & Allen, a firearms company based in Connecticut.

== History ==
In 1871, Sullivan Forehand and Henry C. Wadsworth founded Forehand & Wadsworth from the remnants of Ethan Allen & Company after the death of their father-in-law, Ethan Allen. Wadsworth sold his share of the company to Forehand in 1890 in order to retire, and the company was rebranded as Forehand Arms.

From 1871-1890, the firm was known as Forehand and Wadsworth. In 1890, Henry Wadsworth retired, and the company name was changed to Forehand Arms Company. It operated under the name Forehand Arms Company until the death of Sullivan Forehand in 1898. In 1902, the company was acquired by Hopkins and Allen.

The company manufactured a variety of black powder and cartridge revolvers, including several versions of the British Bull Dog revolver. Other offerings included derringers, rifles, and shotguns.

Forehand's sons ran the business for several years following the death of their father, then sold it in 1902 to Hopkins & Allen, who had been making Forehand Arms' revolvers under contract.

=== Legal matters ===
The company was involved with a patent infringement lawsuit on behalf of one of their employees, John C. Howe, against the United States government. Howe had patented an ammunition cartridge in 1864, and the US government infringed upon this design in 1868 with the "Cup Anvil Cartridge" until the expiration of Howe's patent in 1881. Howe asked Forehand to bring a lawsuit against the government, and eight years later the company won the suit on behalf of Howe with a judgement of $66,000. The lawsuit was not paid until after Howe's death and a few weeks before the death of Forehand in 1898.

== In popular culture ==
A Forehand & Wadsworth British Bull Dog revolver was used in the 1993 movie, Tombstone, by Joanna Pacula while portraying Big Nose Kate.

== Gallery ==
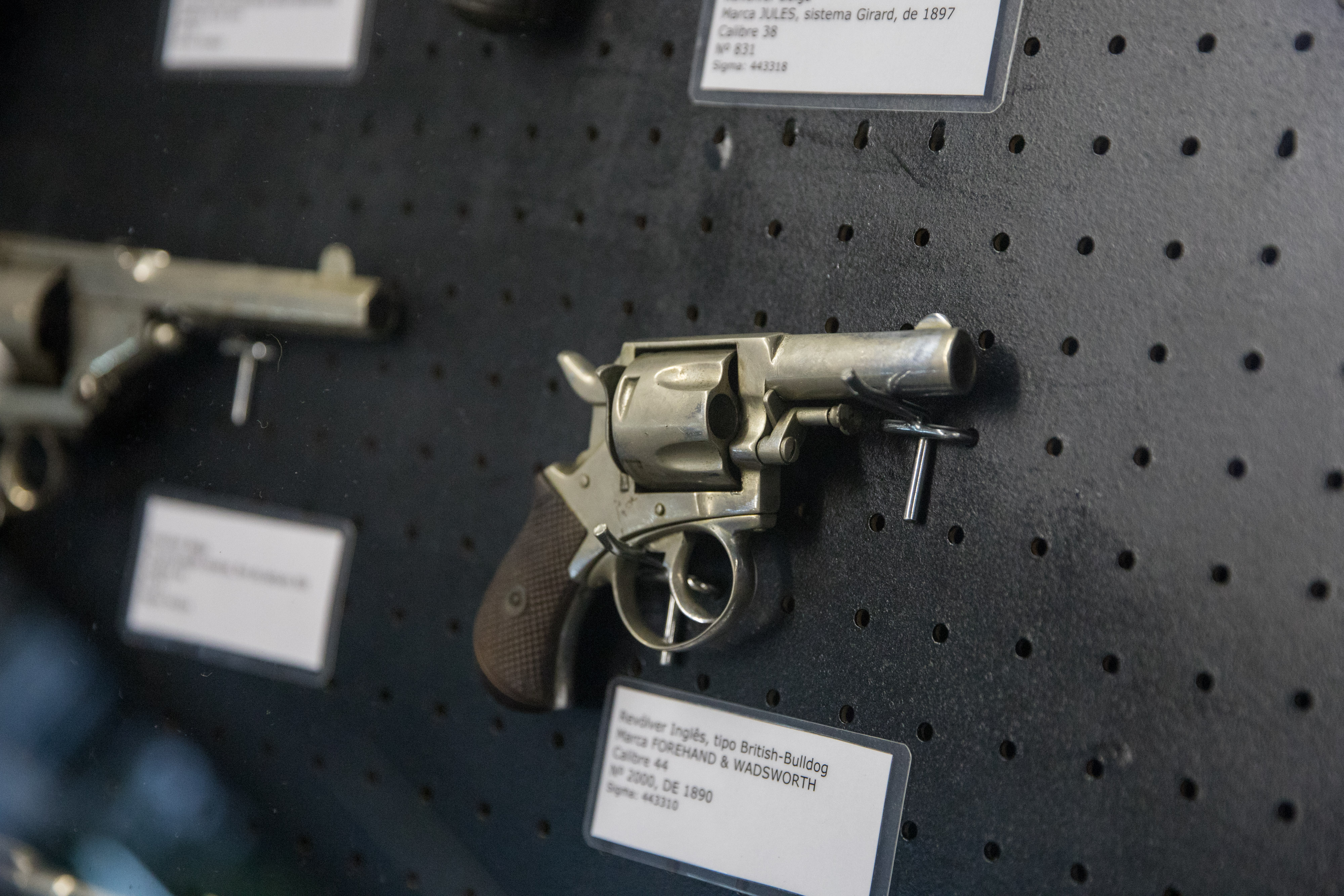
Forehand & Wadsworth British Bull Dog revolver chambered for .44 Bull Dog

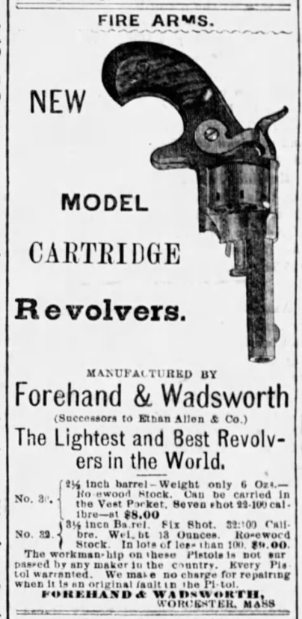
Forehand & Wadsworth advertisement from March 1872 as it appeared in the Quad-City Times of Davenport, Iowa

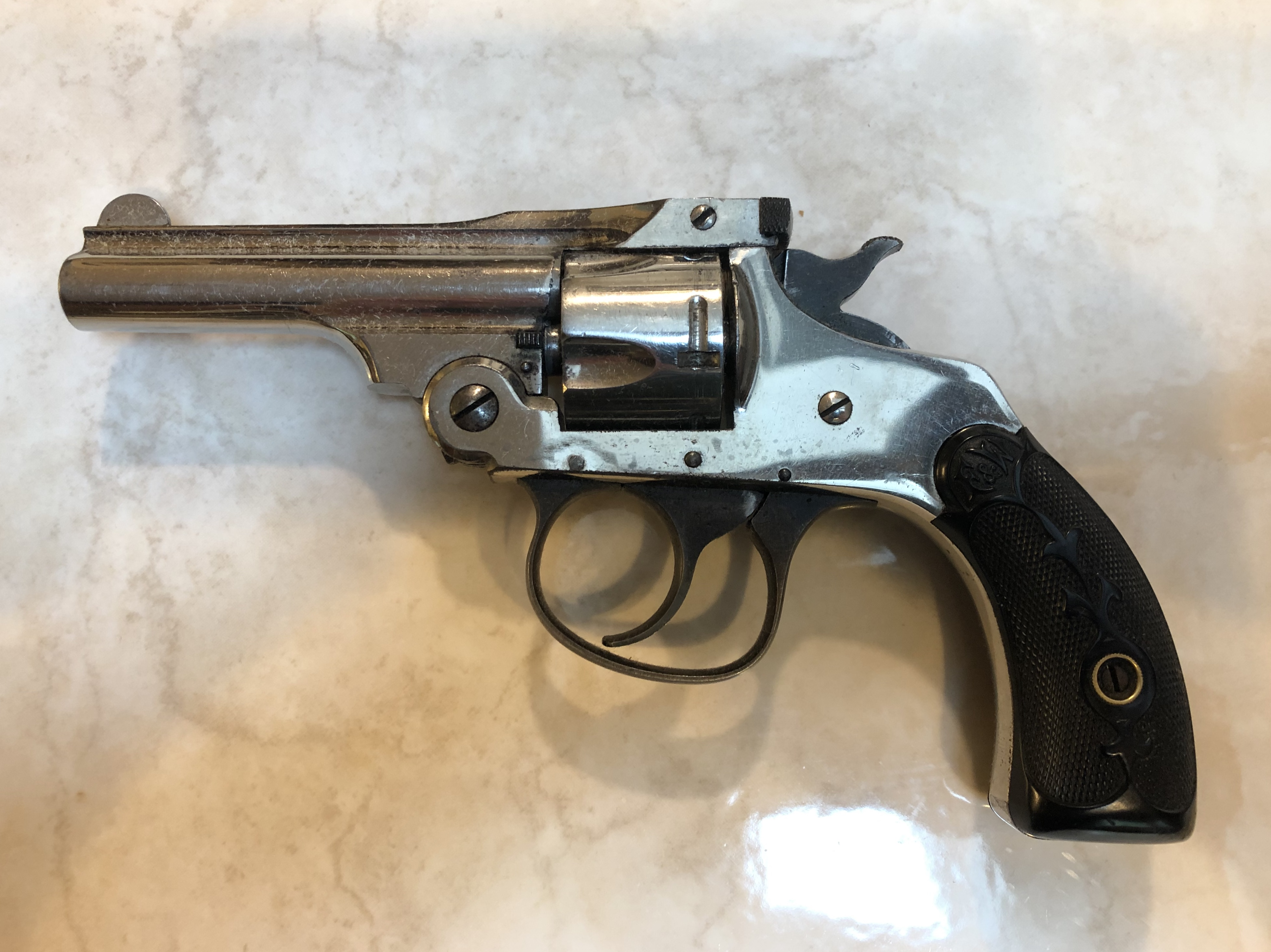
Forehand Arms 5-shot revolver chambered for .32 S&W

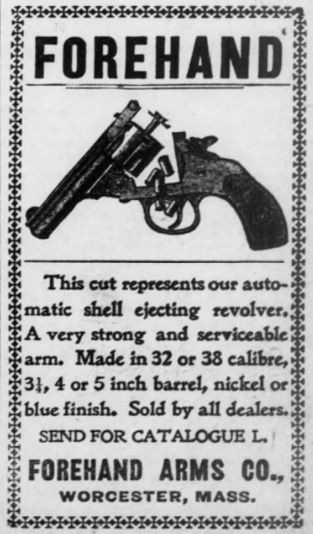
Forehand Arms advertisement from February 1899 as it appeared in The Belle Plaine News of Belle Plaine, Kansas
