= .32 Long Colt =

Revolver cartridge designed by Colt's Manufacturing Company, LLC

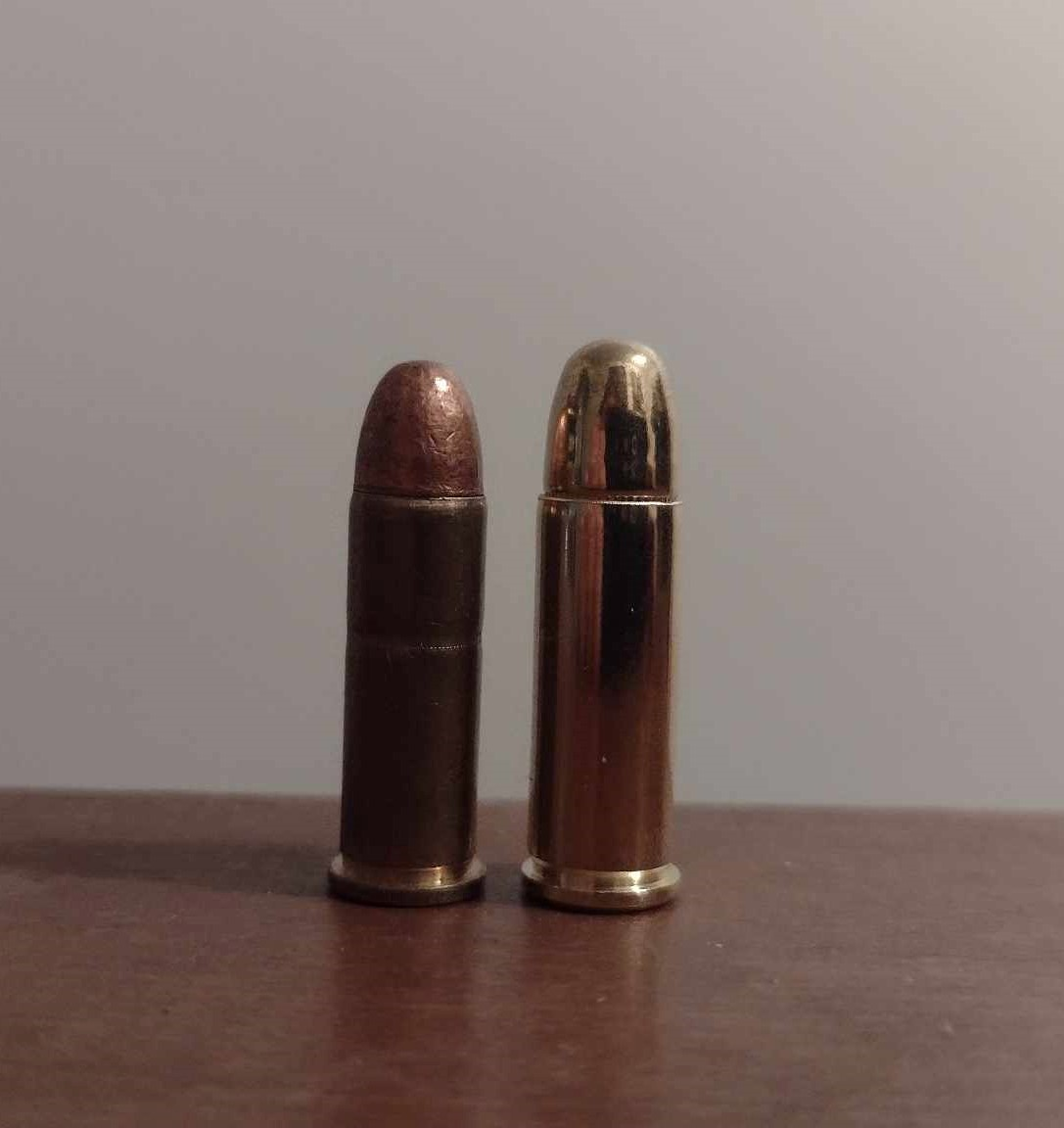
- .32 Long Colt (left) and .32 S&W Long (right)
- Type: Revolver
- Place of origin: United States

Production history
- Designed: 1873
- Produced: 1873–present

Specifications
- Parent case: .320 Revolver
- Case type: Rimmed, straight
- Bullet diameter: .312 in (7.9 mm)
- Neck diameter: .313 in (8.0 mm)
- Base diameter: .318 in (8.1 mm)
- Rim diameter: .374 in (9.5 mm)
- Case length: 0.92 in (23 mm)
- Overall length: 1.26 in (32 mm)
- Rifling twist: 1:16 in (410 mm)
- Primer type: small pistol

Ballistic performance
Bullet mass/type	Velocity	Energy
82 gr (5.3 g) (factory load)	790 ft/s (240 m/s)	114 ft⋅lbf (155 J)
80 gr (5.2 g) lead	840 ft/s (260 m/s)	126 ft⋅lbf (171 J)
95 gr (6.2 g)	700 ft/s (210 m/s)	104 ft⋅lbf (141 J)
- Sources: Barnes & Amber 1972

.32 Long Colt (also known as .32 LC or .32 Colt) is an American rimmed centerfire revolver cartridge introduced in 1873 by Colt. It was developed from the earlier .320 Revolver cartridge and intended for use in small-frame Colt revolvers.

The cartridge was manufactured in several bullet configurations during its production history but saw wider use in Europe than in North America. Despite being similar in appearance and performance to the .32 Smith & Wesson Long, the two cartridges are not interchangeable due to differences in case and bullet dimensions. The .32 Long Colt is no longer in common use but is still produced in small quantities for older firearms.

== Description ==
Introduced by Colt with the New Line revolver in 1873, the .32 Colt was inspired by the .320 Revolver, also called the ".32 Webley". It originally used a .313 in (7.95 mm)-diameter 90 gr (5.8 g) outside-lubricated heeled bullet, which was later changed to inside lubrication. This change led to the diameter shrinking to .299 in (7.59 mm), a slight reduction in bullet weight, and a shortening of overall length. The .32 Long Colt was so popular and introduced so soon after the .320 that enthusiasts and manufacturers began colloquially referring to the .320 as the ".32 Short Colt". Even though this terminology is not technically correct, it is still being used today.

With a case lengthened by .31 in (7.87 mm) over the .320 Revolver (which means that the .320 will chamber and fire in any weapon designed for the .32 Long Colt), the .32 LC is in the same class in power as the .32 Smith & Wesson Long, albeit without comparable accuracy. Although the .32 Long Colt and .32 S&W Long appear to be similar, the two are not interchangeable due to the case and neck diameter being much narrower on the .32 Long Colt.

More popular in Europe than North America, Colt was the most prominent American manufacturer which chambered any weapons in .32 Long Colt, most notably the Police Positive. The FAMAE revolver produced in Chile is currently offered in .32 Long Colt.

== See also ==
- .32 Rimfire
- 8mm caliber
- List of cartridges by caliber

== Notes ==
- Barnes, Frank C., ed. by John T. Amber. ".32 Long Colt—.32 Short Colt" & ".320 Revolver", in Cartridges of the World, pp. 155 & 177. Northfield, IL: DBI Books, 1972. ISBN 0-695-80326-3.
