= .320 Revolver =

Revolver cartridge

- Type: Revolver
- Place of origin: United Kingdom

Production history
- Designer: P. Webley & Son
- Designed: 1868
- Produced: 1868 - 1920s

Specifications
- Parent case: .32 Short Rimfire
- Bullet diameter: .3170 in (8.05 mm)
- Neck diameter: .3200 in (8.13 mm)
- Base diameter: .3220 in (8.18 mm)
- Rim diameter: .3500 in (8.89 mm)
- Case length: .6200 in (15.75 mm)
- Overall length: .9000 in (22.86 mm)
- Rifling twist: 1 turn in 22 in (560 mm)
- Primer type: Berdan

Ballistic performance
Bullet mass/type	Velocity	Energy
80 gr (5 g) Lead	168 m/s (550 ft/s)	73 J (54 ft⋅lbf)
- Sources: Cartridges of the World - 8th Edition (1997), Frank C. Barnes, page 245

The .320 Revolver, also known as the .32 Short Colt or .32 Webley, is an obsolete revolver cartridge. Its ballistic performance is comparable to that of the .25 ACP.

== Name ==
The cartridge is known under a variety of names. In addition to .320 Revolver, it is also called .32 Short Colt, .32 Webley, .320 Short, .320 European and .320 Bulldog. The cartridge was not made by Colt, but because the .32 Long Colt (which was based on the .32 Webley) was introduced soon after, the cartridge became colloquially known as the ".32 Short Colt", or more simply, ".32 Short", to distinguish the two.

== History ==
The .320 Revolver was designed for the Webley Bull Dog pocket revolver in 1868 and similar revolvers made in Belgium that followed. The .320 can be viewed as a centerfire version of the .32 Rimfire, albeit less powerful. Certain types of .32 Short Colt cartridges had a slightly different-sized rim. On some guns, these .32 Short Colt rounds will fit and cycle properly. Due to the popularity of the .32 Long Colt and, later, the more accurate .32 Smith & Wesson Long, the older .32-caliber cartridges, such as the .320 and the .32 Rimfire, declined in popularity and were eventually more or less obsolete by the 1920s. In Brazil, both .320 guns and ammo (double-barreled, side-by-side pistols) were made up to the 1960s. Amadeo Rossi made his Model 8 "Garrucha" in .320 from 1950 to 1962. Ammunition for the .320 was briefly made by Fiocchi in 2015. Winchester also briefly produced this cartridge, although it is now discontinued.
