= Marlin Model 1897 =

- Type: Lever-action rifle
- Place of origin: United States

Production history
- Designed: 1897
- Manufacturer: Marlin Firearms Company
- Developed from: Marlin Model 1892
- Developed into: Marlin Model 39
- Produced: 1897–1922
- No. built: 81,000

Specifications
- Mass: 5 lb (2.3 kg) - 6.25 lb (2.83 kg)
- Barrel length: 16 in (410 mm) - 28 in (710 mm)
- Cartridge: .22 Long Rifle, .22 short, .22 long
- Action: Lever-action
- Feed system: tubular magazine

The Marlin Model 1897 is a firearm that was produced by Marlin Firearms.

== History ==
The rifle was available between 1897 and 1922. It is also referred to as the "Model 97", the gun was redesigned as the "Marlin Model '97" in 1905.

In 1897, the manufacturer's suggested retail price (MSRP) was US$15.35.

It was speculated that 81,000 Marlin 1897 rifles were manufactured.

In 1997, Marlin manufactured a commemorative reissue of the firearm, with these versions dubbed the "1897 Century Limited".

== Design and features ==
The Model 1897 improved upon the design of the Marlin Model 1892.

The Model 1897 is a lever action, takedown rifle. It was only manufactured in takedown models chambered for .22 rimfire. It is a .22 S L L R firearm, meaning that it is chambered for .22 rimfire rounds, and is interchangeably able to fire .22 Long Rifle, .22 long, and .22 short. It uses a tubular magazine. Full-length models hold ten rounds of .22 Long Rifle, twenty rounds of .22 long, and twenty-five rounds of .22 short. Half-length models hold ten rounds of .22 Long Rifle, twelve rounds off .22 long, and sixteen rounds of .22 short. It has a hexagonal barrel.

The Model 1897's weight ranges between 5 lb (2.3 kg) and 6.25 lb (2.83 kg). Its barrel length ranged between 16 in (410 mm) and 28 in (710 mm). It is equipped with iron sights, featuring an open rear sight paired with a bead front sight. Standard to the gun is a plain straight-grip stock. However, versions are available with a pistol grip stock.

Among the variants produced was a compact "bicycle rifle" version with a 16-inch barrel. Only 216 versions of that variant were produced.

== Influence on later firearms ==
The Model 1897's design influenced the Marlin Model 39, which ultimately evolved into the Marlin Model Golden 39A.
