= Hopkins & Allen =

American firearms manufacturing company

Hopkins & Allen Arms Co.
- Type: Firearms Manufacturer
- Industry: Firearms
- Founded: 1868
- Headquarters: Norwich, Connecticut, United States
- Key people: Charles W. Allen
- Products: Shotguns, revolvers, rifles

Hopkins & Allen Arms Company was an American firearms manufacturing company based in Norwich, Connecticut, that was founded in 1868 by Charles W. Allen, Charles A. Converse, Horace Briggs, Samuel S. Hopkins and Charles W. Hopkins. The Hopkins brothers ran the company's day-to-day operations until it went bankrupt in 1916 and was subsequently bought by Marlin-Rockwell.

== History ==
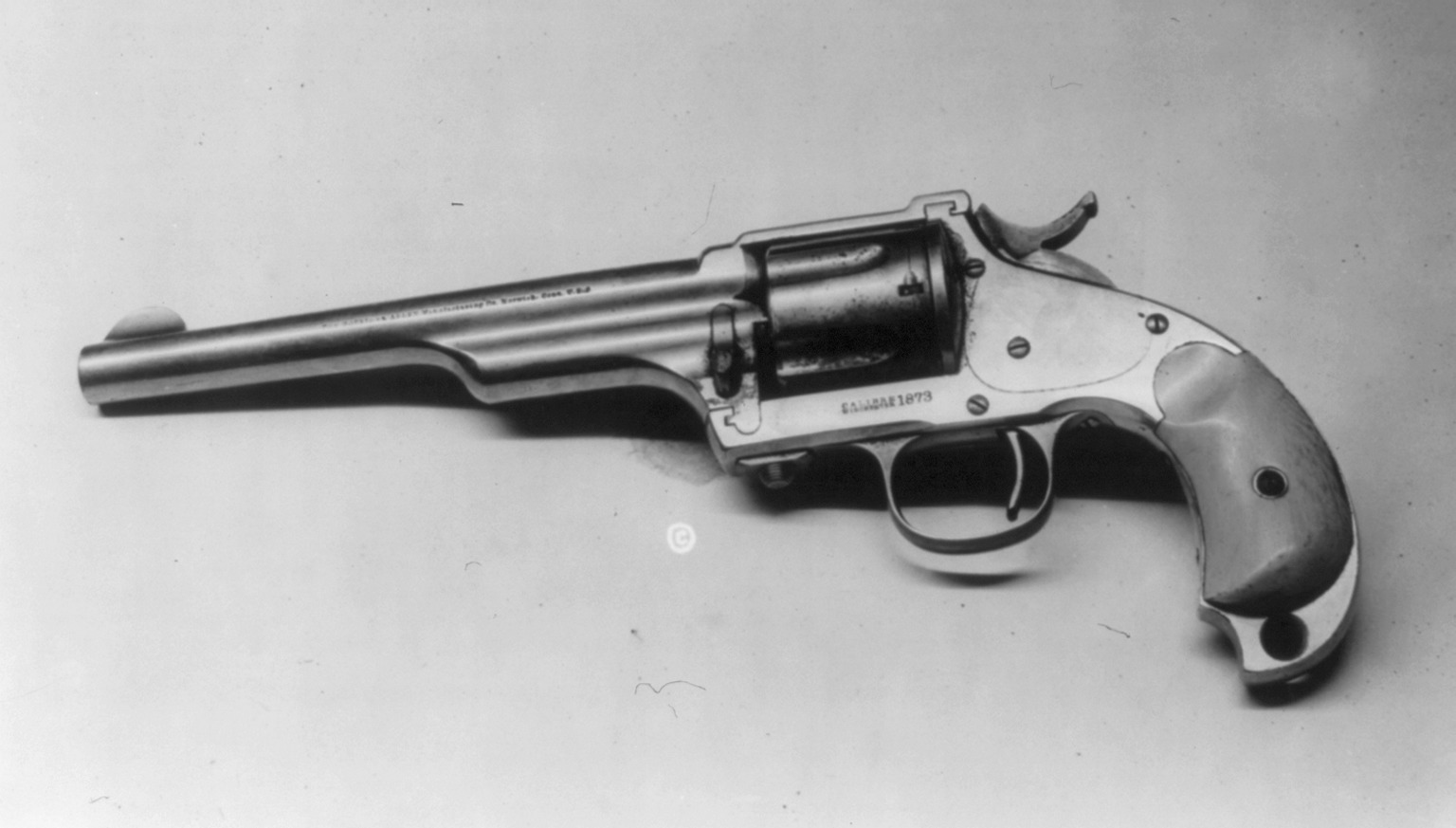
Jesse James' 44 caliber Hopkins & Allen pistol, 1873 model

Hopkins & Allen was founded in 1868 as a firearms manufacturer by Charles W. Allen, Charles A. Converse, Horace Briggs, Samuel S. Hopkins and Charles W. Hopkins. The latter was a former business partner of Thomas K. Bacon and an early swinging-cylinder revolver inventor. In 1874 Converse sold his interest in the company to brothers William and Milan Hulbert, giving the Hulberts 50% of the company's assets and capital. The company became the exclusive maker of Merwin Hulbert revolvers as a result of this and assembly of these revolvers was conducted in a separate area of the plant devoted to M&H revolvers. Following the bankruptcy of the Hulbert brothers in 1896, Hopkins & Allen went bankrupt in 1898. The company was reorganized as Hopkins & Allen Arms Company but lost its factory and machinery in a fire in 1900. In 1905 the entire warehouse was robbed of all its inventory.

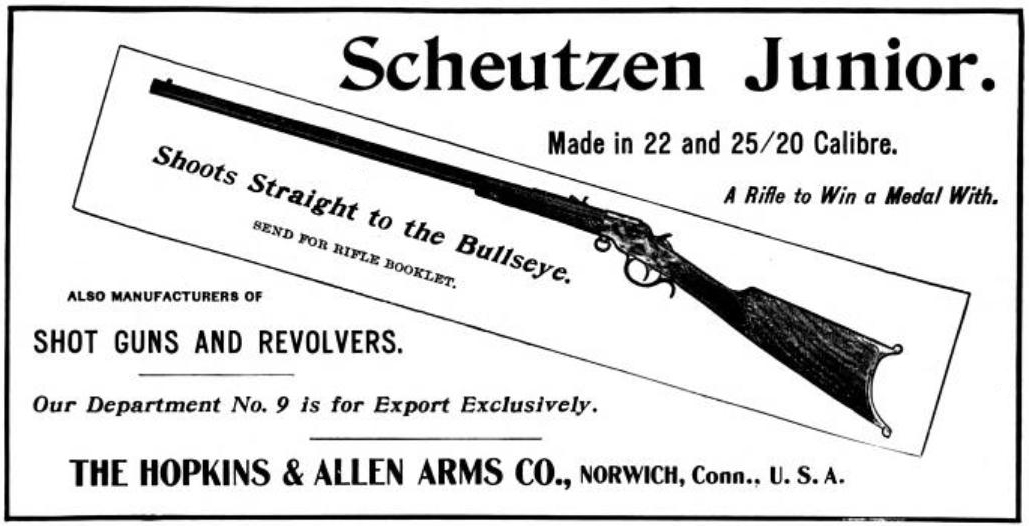
The Hopkins & Allen Arms Co. - Norwich, Connecticut, 1904

The factory was rebuilt in 1901 and Hopkins & Allen would go on to produce 40,000 firearms a year. In 1902, the company acquired Forehand Arms Company, for whom it had been making revolvers under contract.

The company started tooling up in 1915 for producing 400,000 SMLEs, but the British gave no money down and the end-of-the-year deadline wasn't plausible to meet, so it ended up in a difficult situation already then. In August of the same year it was awarded a contract to build around 140,000 Mauser Model 1889 rifles and 10,000 carbines for the Belgian Army, but it turned out that they underestimated the cost of production during a European war and underbid the price (the first rifles were only completed in September 1916 and only arrived to Belgium in 1918). Although the company continued to manufacture firearms, it never financially recovered and went bankrupt in 1916 with Marlin-Rockwell purchasing its machinery, inventory and designs in 1917.

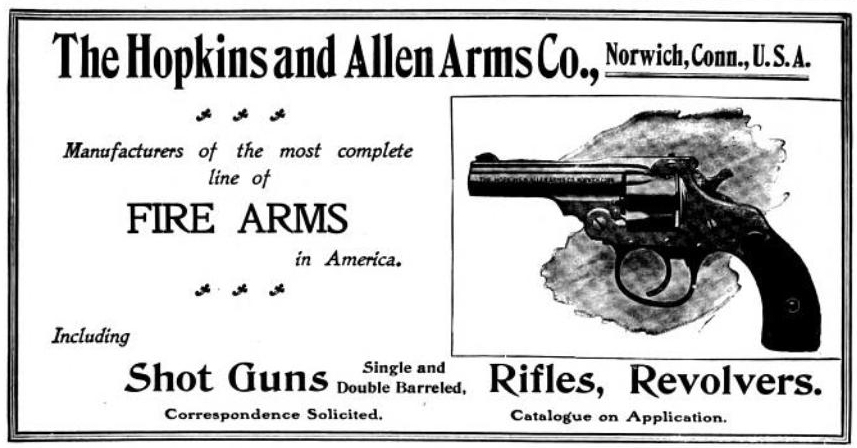
The Hopkins and Allen Arms Co. - Shotguns, Rifles and Revolvers - 1904

== Manufacturing ==
In addition to the Merwin Hulbert revolvers, Hopkins & Allen manufactured a variety of spur trigger single-action revolvers in .22, .32, and .38 calibers with trade names such as ACME, American Eagle, Blue Jacket, Captain Jack, Chichester, Defender, Dictator, Imperial Arms Co., Monarch, Mountain Eagle, Ranger, Tower's Police Safety, Universal, and XL, and later hinged-frame double-action models. Hopkins & Allen manufactured revolvers for Forehand & Wadsworth under contract as well as shotguns, rifles, and derringers for various sporting goods stores.
