= Eugene Reising =

American firearm designer

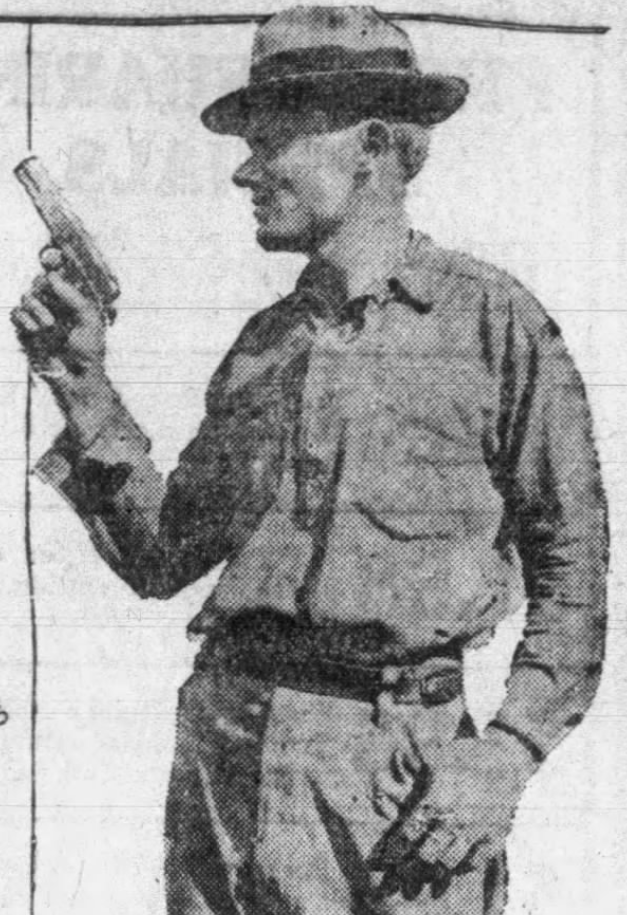
- Performing a pistol demonstration in 1911
- Born: Eugene Gustavus Reising; November 26, 1884; Port Jervis, New York U.S.
- Died: February 21, 1967 (aged 82); Worcester, Massachusetts U.S.
- Occupation: Firearms designer
- Spouses: Frances Rose Reising; Alice V. Fohlin

Eugene Gustavus Reising (November 26, 1884 – February 21, 1967) was an American inventor who designed the M50 Reising submachine gun in 1938. Reising was a ranked competitive target shooter. An ordnance engineer, Reising was the recipient of more than 60 firearm patents. Following his work with Harrington & Richardson, he designed semi-automatic rifles for Mossberg & Sons, Marlin, Savage, and Stevens.

== Biography ==
Of Swedish ancestry from a family that came to Delaware in 1635, Reising was born in Port Jervis, New York. He was the son of a railroad engineer who died when Eugene Reising was an infant. Reising attended Lehigh University for three years, then worked as a cowboy in Texas and Mexico for a few years. On returning to the U.S. he went to work for Colt, testing and selling guns. He worked with John M. Browning on the development of the Colt Model 1911 pistol.

In 1911, Reising served in Company A of the Connecticut National Guard, winning a championship in expert riflemanship and giving demonstrations of the rapid reloading of semi-automatic pistols. In the same year, he demonstrated a 9.8-mm version of the Colt pistol, which was adopted as the M1911 by authorities in three Balkan countries, but two years later, he was fired from the company for using a Luger pistol at a target shooting competition.

In October 1925, Reising was indicted for violating the Sullivan Act after supplying pistols and Maxim Silencers to a member of the Cowboy Tessler gang, a group that was captured after a string of robberies and a gun battle with police in New York. He pleaded guilty to unlawful possession of firearms and was sentenced to fifteen months' imprisonment on Welfare Island.

In 1938, Reising began work on a new submachine gun. He submitted his design to Harrington and Richardson, and in March 1941, they started manufacturing it as the Model 50. Approximately 100,000 of these were made, and many were used in World War II.

His wife, Frances Rose Reising, died in Hartford on April 26, 1947. He remarried, to Alice V. Fohlin.

Eugene Reising died in Worcester, Massachusetts, on February 20, 1967.
