= Gilbert Henderson Harrington =

American inventor and manufacturer (1845–1897)

- Born: April 17, 1845; Shrewsbury, Massachusetts, U.S.
- Died: June 22, 1897 (aged 52)
- Occupations: Inventor; manufacturer
- Spouses: Christine I. Dibble (died 1875) Charlotte M. Harrington (died 1885) Myrtis S. Sigourney (m. 1886)
- Children: 3
- Relatives: Daniel B. Wesson (uncle); Frank Wesson (uncle)

Gilbert Henderson Harrington (April 17, 1845 – June 22, 1897) was the main founder of the arms manufacturing firm of Harrington & Richardson.

== Early life ==
Gilbert Henderson Harrington was born on April 17, 1845, in Shrewsbury, Massachusetts, to Cornelia Bush (née Wesson) and Henry Henderson Harrington. His father was a farmer. His maternal uncle was gun manufacturer Daniel B. Wesson. The family moved to Worcester, Massachusetts, while he was still a child. As a boy, he worked at a small shop in Worcester dedicated to manufacturing guns owned by Ballard and Fairbanks.

== Career ==
Working in the shop in Worcester, Harrington invented and patented a shell-ejecting revolver. He took over the shop after Ballard and Fairbanks discontinued making revolvers.

Harrington's uncle, Frank Wesson, started a firearms manufacturing firm in 1859. Wesson began a brief partnership with Harrington in 1871, as Wesson & Harrington, until Harrington bought him out in 1872 or 1874. He then formed a partnership with William A. Richardson, a former employee of the Ballard and Fairbanks shop, under the name Harrington & Richardson. They had a workshop at 18 Manchester Street in Worcester and produced the revolver that Harrington invented. In 1876, they displayed the revolver at the Centennial Exposition, and they moved their workshop to 31 Hermon Street in Worcester. They continued producing the revolver until 1878. On March 6, 1878, George F. Brooks joined the business and Harrington became the head of the sales department. In 1880, the company was given a license to manufacture the Anson and Deely double-barreled shotguns. They continued manufacturing them until 1885. In January 1888, the business was incorporated as Harrington and Richardson Arms Company and he became president. In 1894, they expanded to the corner of Park Avenue and Chandler Street. He was president of the company at the time of his death.

== Personal life ==
Harrington married Christine I. Dibble. They had one son, Charles H. His wife died in 1875. He married Charlotte M. Harrington, daughter of Isaac Sylvester Harrington. They had two sons, Edwin Chester and John Walter. His second wife died in 1885. He married Myrtis S. Sigourney of Oxford, Massachusetts, in 1886. Harrington spent most of his life in Worcester and lived at 1014 Main Street in Worcester. He often vacationed in Winter Park, Florida. He was a member of the Pilgrim Congregational Church.

Around 1891, Harrington began having heart trouble. He died on June 22, 1897.
