= Bassett Road machine gun murders =

Notorious double murder in 1963 New Zealand

Coordinates: 36.8666°S 174.7842°E

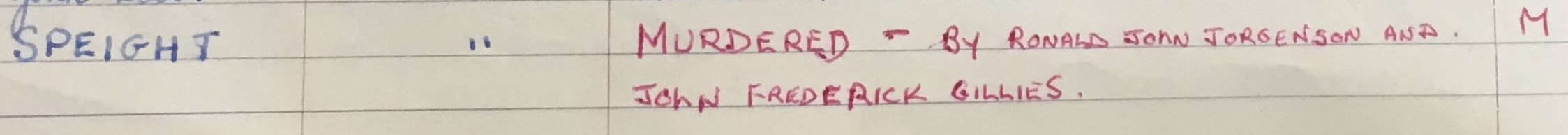
The 1964 coroner's inquest register, showing the entry for Kevin James Speight

The Bassett Road machine gun murders were the murders of two men with a .45 calibre Reising submachine gun on 7 December 1963 at 115 Bassett Road in the Auckland suburb of Remuera in New Zealand. The crime received considerable media attention and captured the public imagination for many years. Although the weapon was set to single and not rapid-fire for the killings, word spread quickly of a "Chicago-style" gang murder previously unheard of in New Zealand.

The victims were a commercial traveller and a seaman, found dead in a residential property which was used as a "beerhouse". While legal pubs were forced to close for the night at six o'clock, people continued drinking in quasi-criminal beerhouses which were operated by criminal figures and their associates. Although illegal, the beerhouses were regarded as a form of petty criminality and tolerated until referendums in New Zealand made it possible for licensed pubs to open past six o'clock and made beerhouses obsolete in 1968. During this illicit period, beerhouses served as a meeting place for beatnik modernist poets and musicians, sportspeople involved in boxing and the rugby league, wealthy people who "slummed" with the criminal underworld, drug addicts, alcoholics, gamblers, and hardened criminals.

== Crime ==
Frederick George Walker, a 38-year-old commercial traveller, and Kevin James Speight, a 26-year-old seaman, were found shot several times with large calibre bullets at the Bassett Road house. The house was not solely a residential property but used as a "beerhouse", given that until 9 October 1967, New Zealand pubs were forced to close for the night at six o'clock, resulting in either hurried consumption of alcoholic beverages as the time neared or else visits to a beerhouse to continue alcohol consumption. Given their quasi-criminal operation, many beerhouses were operated by criminal figures and their associates. At the time the murders occurred, Walker and Speight were believed to be illegally trading in liquor at their premises as a beerhouse. Although illegal, the beerhouses were regarded as a form of petty criminality and tolerated until referendums in New Zealand made it possible for licensed pubs to open past six o'clock and made beerhouses obsolete in 1968. During this illicit period, beerhouses served as a meeting place for beatnik modernist poets and musicians, figures from the boxing and rugby league sporting community, affluent community members who "slummed" with the underworld, drug addicts, alcoholics, borderline or criminal practitioners of gambling in New Zealand, and hardened criminals. They were also distribution points for cannabis in New Zealand and other illegal recreational drugs during the 1940s and 1950s.

== Investigation and trial ==
The scientific investigation identified the weapon used as possibly a .45 calibre machine gun. At that time, New Zealand's firearms control legislation was lax, as many returned military personnel had residual weapons from their Second World War service period. The foreign firearms trade was also served by lax border regulation of potentially offensive weapons. Two notable figures within the New Zealand criminal underworld, John Gillies and Ronald Jorgensen, were arrested on 31 December 1963 and stood trial starting 24 February 1964. Although Jorgensen had been easily caught, Gillies had evaded arrest for several days.

Formerly a sailor, Jorgensen had just finished a two-year prison sentence, although he had served time in borstal beforehand. As a young offender, he met John Gillies in 1951. Crewing on naval vessels, they maintained intermittent contact over the next decade, until they met again in Auckland in 1962. Born in Kaikōura on Upper Canterbury's eastern coast of the South Island to an authoritarian Danish father, Jorgensen had a history of assault and theft in Christchurch. John Gillies also originated from the South Island. In 1956, he had fled trial on a number of criminal offenses to Australia, until a further prison sentence in Melbourne's Pentridge Prison led to his deportation back to New Zealand in October 1963.

Both men denied charges of murder, although Gillies admitted acquiring a machine gun for his own protection. Both men were convicted and sentenced to life imprisonment.

== Aftermath ==
While in prison, Jorgensen took up painting and sold a number of his works. He was later paroled under strict conditions, including that he must remain in Kaikoura living with his father for an indefinite period. Jorgensen vanished in mysterious circumstances in 1984 after his car was found wrecked at the bottom of a cliff. Police initially suspected that he had faked his death but later declared him legally dead.

In 2010, an episode of TVNZ's The Missing directed by Tom Reilly traced the life and disappearance of Jorgensen and uncovered several eyewitnesses who claimed to have seen him in Perth, Australia in the late 1980s and early 1990s. The makers of the show concluded that there is strong evidence Jorgensen faked his own death and fled New Zealand in 1984. A historical account of the crime has since been written. Involved on the periphery of these issues at the time were two New Zealand National Party politicians, Robert Muldoon (a future New Zealand Prime Minister) and John Banks, whose father Archibald was involved in the beerhouse/sly grog milieu and sent his then-teenage son out to provide cleaning services for his father's clients.

Gillies was paroled in the late 1960s, but although he had learned technical drawing within the prison, he soon got into trouble with criminal justice system once again and served further prison sentences before his final release in 1987. He lived under a new identity in Wellington until dying in 2019. Police personnel involved in the investigation and trial testimony went on to rise high within the police hierarchy over the ensuing decades.

In June 2019, an oil painting purportedly painted by Jorgensen was offered for sale by auction. It had fallen from the ceiling space of a garage during the 2016 Kaikōura earthquake.

== See also ==
- Crime in New Zealand
- Jorgensen v News Media (Auckland) Ltd
- Lists of people who disappeared
