= M50 Reising =

Reising Model 50
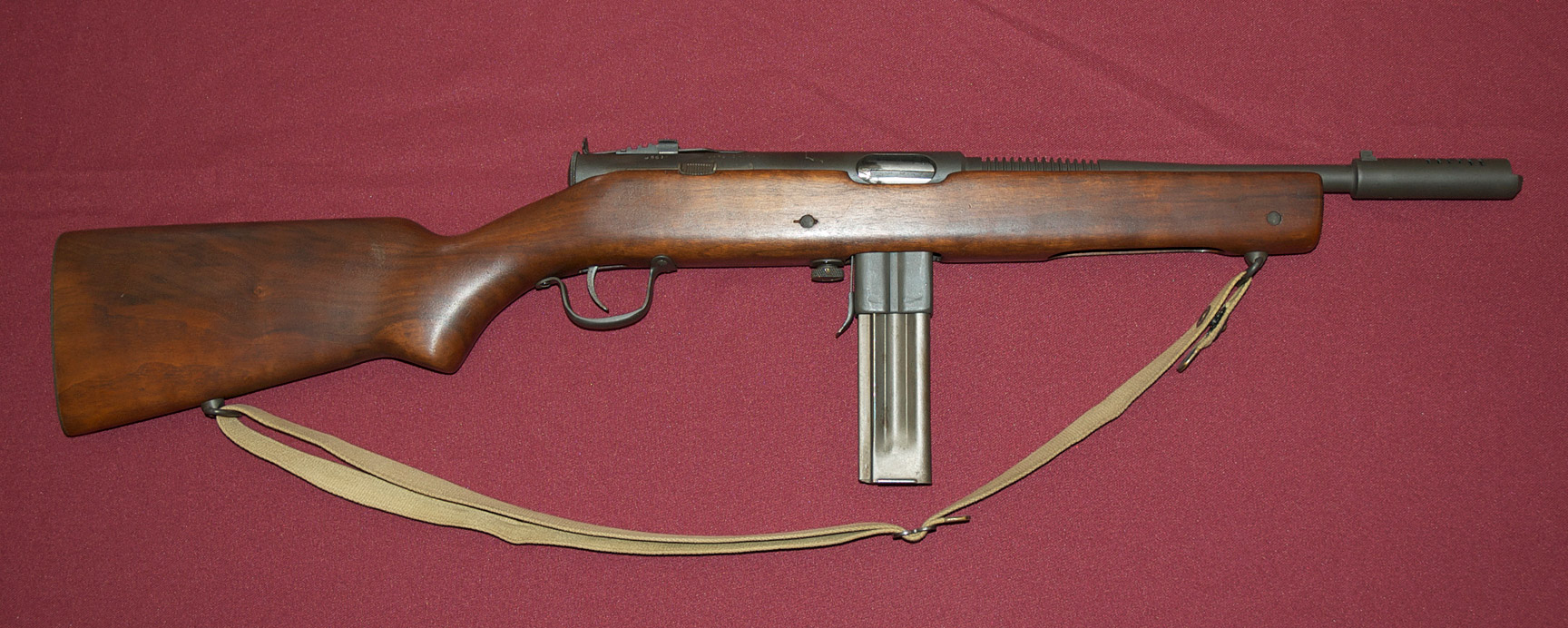
- The Reising Model 50 submachine gun
- Type: Submachine gun
- Place of origin: United States

Service history
- In service: 1941–1975
- Used by: See Users
- Wars: World War II; Hukbalahap Rebellion; Malayan Emergency; Calderonista invasion of Costa Rica; Vietnam War; Dominican Civil War

Production history
- Designer: Eugene Reising
- Designed: 1940
- Manufacturer: Harrington & Richardson
- Produced: 1941–1945
- Variants: M50, M55, M60

Specifications
- Mass: 3.1 kg (6.83 lb) (M50); 2.8 kg (6.2 lb) (M55)
- Length: 895.35 mm (35.250 in); 565.15 mm (22.3 in) stock retracted (M55)
- Barrel length: 279 mm (11.0 in) (M50)
- Cartridge: .45 ACP (M50, M55, M60).22 LR (M65)
- Action: Delayed blowback, closed bolt
- Rate of fire: 550 rounds/min (M50); 500 rounds/min (M55)
- Muzzle velocity: 280 m/s (919 ft/s)
- Maximum firing range: 274 m (300 yards)
- Feed system: 12- or 20-round detachable box magazine, 30-round aftermarket detachable box magazine
- Sights: Front blade, rear notch

The .45 Reising submachine gun was manufactured by Harrington & Richardson (H&R) Arms Company in Worcester, Massachusetts, USA, and was designed and patented by Eugene Reising in 1940. The three versions of the weapon were the Model 50, the folding stock Model 55, and the semiautomatic Model 60 rifle. Over 100,000 Reisings were ordered during World War II, and were initially used by the United States Navy, Marine Corps, and the United States Coast Guard, though some were shipped to Canadian, Soviet, and other allied forces to fight the Axis powers.

== History ==
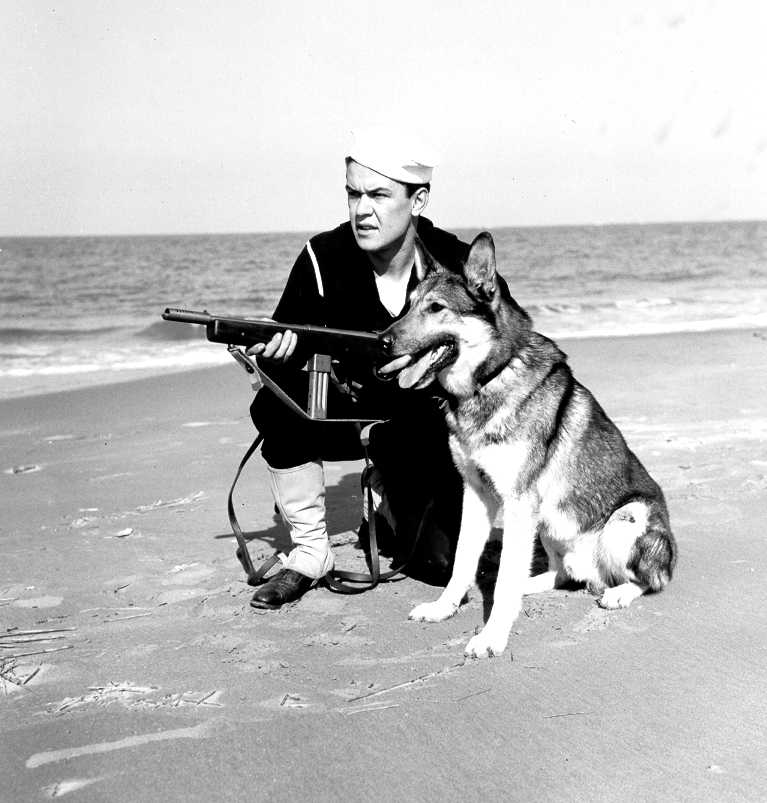
A U.S. Coast Guard sailor on shore patrol with working dog and a Reising Model 50 with 12-round magazine.

Reising was an assistant to firearm inventor John M. Browning. In this role, Reising contributed to the final design of the US .45 ACP M1911 pistol. Reising then designed a number of commercial rifles and pistols on his own, when in 1938, he turned his attention to designing a submachine gun as threats of war rapidly grew in Europe.

Two years later he submitted his completed design to the Harrington & Richardson Arms Company (H&R) in Worcester, Massachusetts. It was accepted, and in March 1941, H&R started manufacturing the Model 50 submachine gun. Months later, production began on the Model 55, which was identical to the Model 50 other than having a folding wire buttstock, no compensator, and a 10.5 in (270 mm) barrel; and the Model 60 semiautomatic rifle that also resembled a Model 50, but had an 18.75 in (476 mm) barrel without cooling fins or a compensator.

H&R promoted the submachine guns for police and military use, and the Model 60 for security guards. After the Japanese attack on Pearl Harbor in December 1941 the US was suddenly in desperate need of thousands of modern automatic weapons. Reising's only competitor was the .45 ACP Thompson submachine gun.

The US Army first tested the Reising in November 1941 at Fort Benning, Georgia. During this test, several parts failed due to poor construction. Once this was corrected, a second test was made in 1942 at Aberdeen Proving Ground, Maryland. In that test, 3,500 rounds were fired, resulting in two malfunctions: one from the ammunition, the other from a bolt malfunction. As a result, the Army did not adopt the Reising, but the Navy and Marines did, due to insufficient supply of Thompsons.

The Reising submachine gun was innovative for its time. In comparison to its main rival, the famous Thompson, it possessed similar firepower, better accuracy, excellent balance, a lighter weight, a much lower cost, and greater ease of manufacture. Despite these achievements, the poor combat performance of the Reising—contrasted with favorable combat and law enforcement use of the Thompson—mired the weapon in controversy.

== Design ==
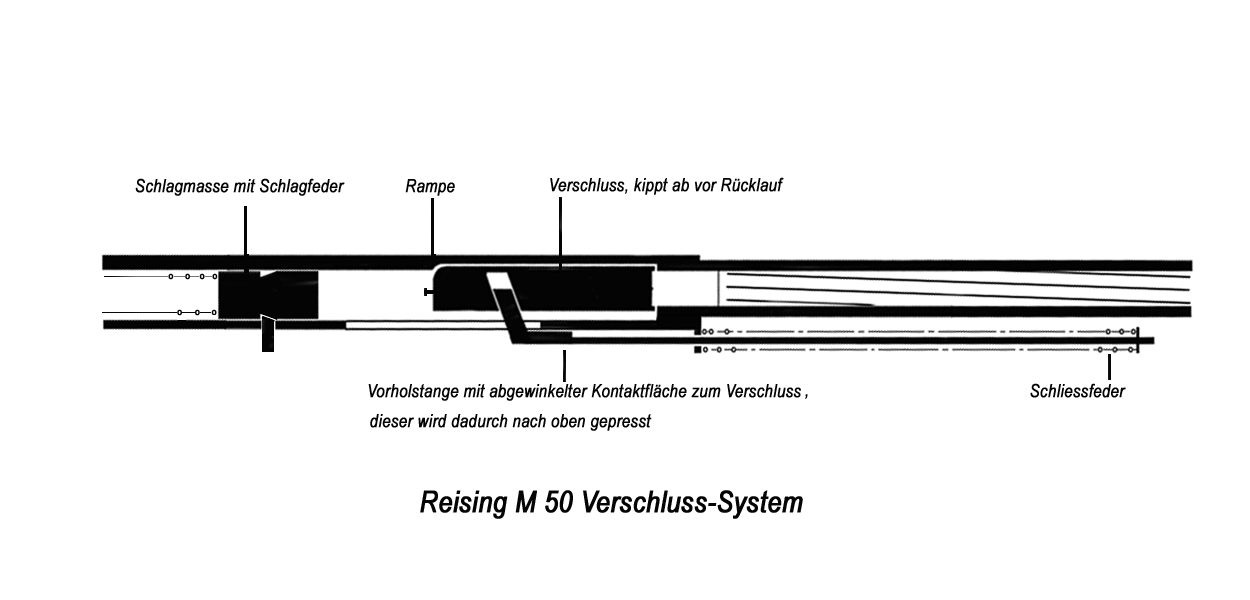

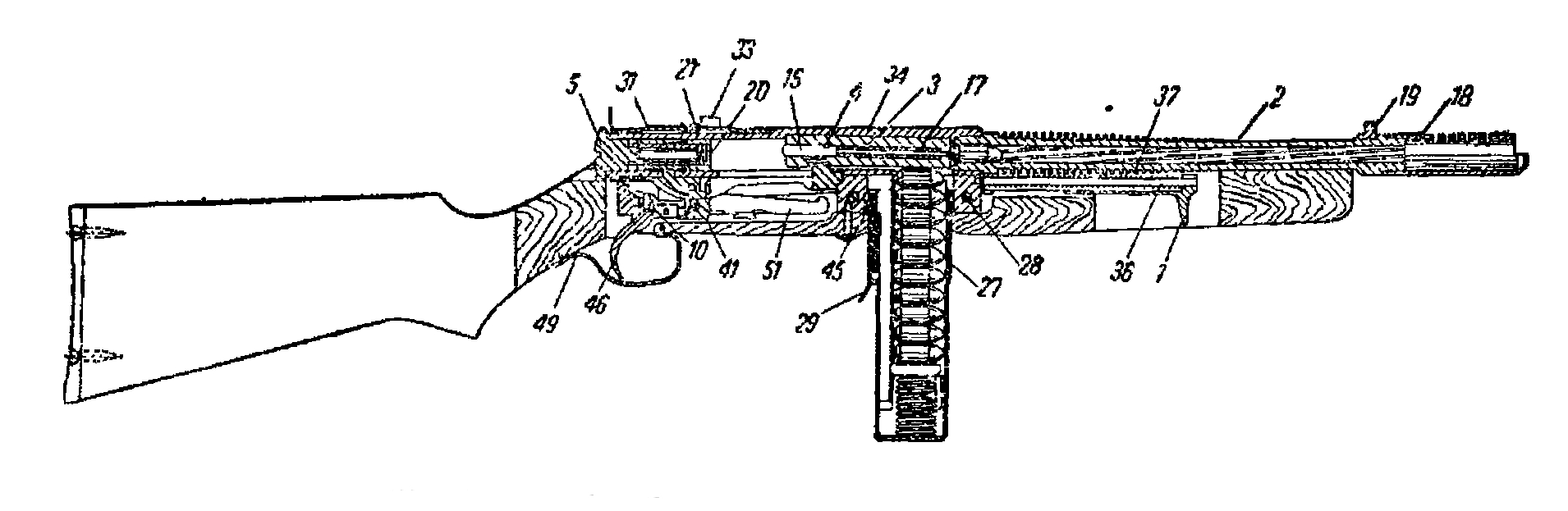
Schematic of the M50 Reising

The Reising was far less costly ($62) compared to the Thompson ($200). It was much lighter (seven vs. eleven pounds). The Model 55 was also more compact (about twenty-two vs. thirty-three inches in length).

The Reising cost less than the Thompson because its metal components were mostly stampings instead of machined parts. This also allowed it to be lighter, as did its firing mechanism. Like the 1928A1 Thompson, its operating principle was delayed blowback, but the Thompson's Blish lock system was far less mechanically effective and so, like a simple blowback weapon, the Thompson was dependent on high bolt mass or more specifically bolt inertia to provide an acceptably low rate of fire. That is, a lighter bolt, as used in earlier models of the Thompson, would have reciprocated faster and produced too great a firing speed. This in turn meant that the Thompson could not be radically lightened without a deterioration in its controllability, as a heavy gun was necessary in automatic fire, to counteract and stabilize the effects on control and accuracy of its heavy bolt moving back and forwards. The Reising's bolt is much lighter due to its delayed blowback mechanism being the main determinant of the automatic rate of fire; and consequently the whole gun could be correspondingly light without detracting from accuracy and controllability.

The M50 Reising's delayed blowback operation, often classified as hesitation lock, works as follows: as the cartridge is chambered, the rear end of the bolt is pushed up into a recess, in a manner similar to tilting-bolt locked breech guns; but whereas such weapons rely on an additional mechanism to unlock them, in the case of the Reising the end of the bolt that pushes against the back wall of this recess, is subtly rounded, while the wall is correspondingly curved. On firing, the extreme pressure from the propellant gases is thereby able to force the bolt-end down, back to the horizontal. From here the bolt can move to the rear removing the cartridge from the chamber; but the combination of mechanical disadvantage and friction the force of the gases must overcome to push the end of the bolt down has achieved a delay of a fraction of a second, allowing pressure in the barrel to drop to a level sufficiently low for safe and efficient cartridge extraction.

The Reising fired from a closed bolt with its return spring as part of its cocking handle underneath the barrel. It notably used a linear hammer in the main receiver.

The Reising was more balanced than the Thompson because the barrel-and-receiver-group rested concentrically within the stock. It had smoother lines in that the stock was of conventional shape, and because the cocking handle (action bar) was placed inside the forearm. In addition, it was more accurate both in semi-auto and at the onset of automatic fire, because due to it being a closed bolt gun, only the linear hammer and firing pin moved at the moment the trigger was squeezed, whereas the Thompson slammed home a heavy bolt and actuator.

The Reising was made in selective fire versions that could be switched between semi-automatic or full-automatic fire as needed and in semi-auto only versions to be used for marksmanship training and police and guard use. The Reising had a designed full-auto cyclic rate of 450–600 rounds per minute but it was reported that the true full-auto rate was closer to 750–850 rounds per minute. At those rates, the twenty round magazine could be emptied in less than two seconds. In 1941, the Reising was priced at approximately $50 per weapon as opposed to $225 for the standard military issue Thompson submachine gun.

== Variants ==
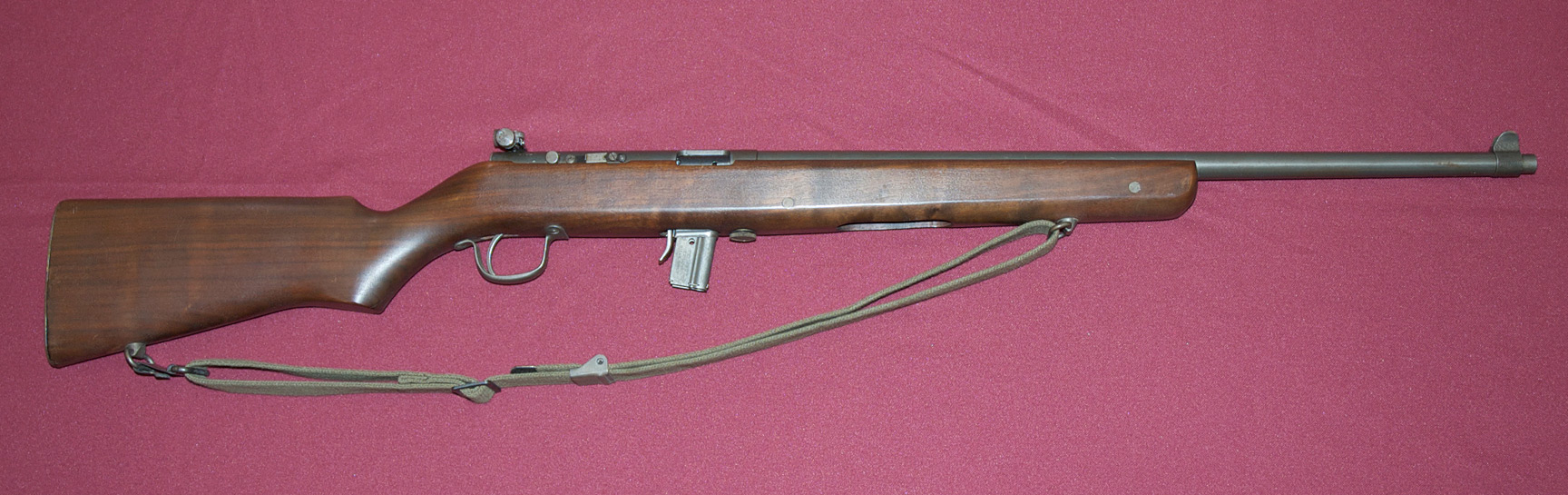
Reising Model 65 training rifle

There were four versions of the Reising, two selective fire models: the M50 and M55, and two semi-automatic only variants: the M60, a .45 ACP carbine, and the M65, chambered for the .22 Long Rifle rimfire cartridge designed for training purposes.

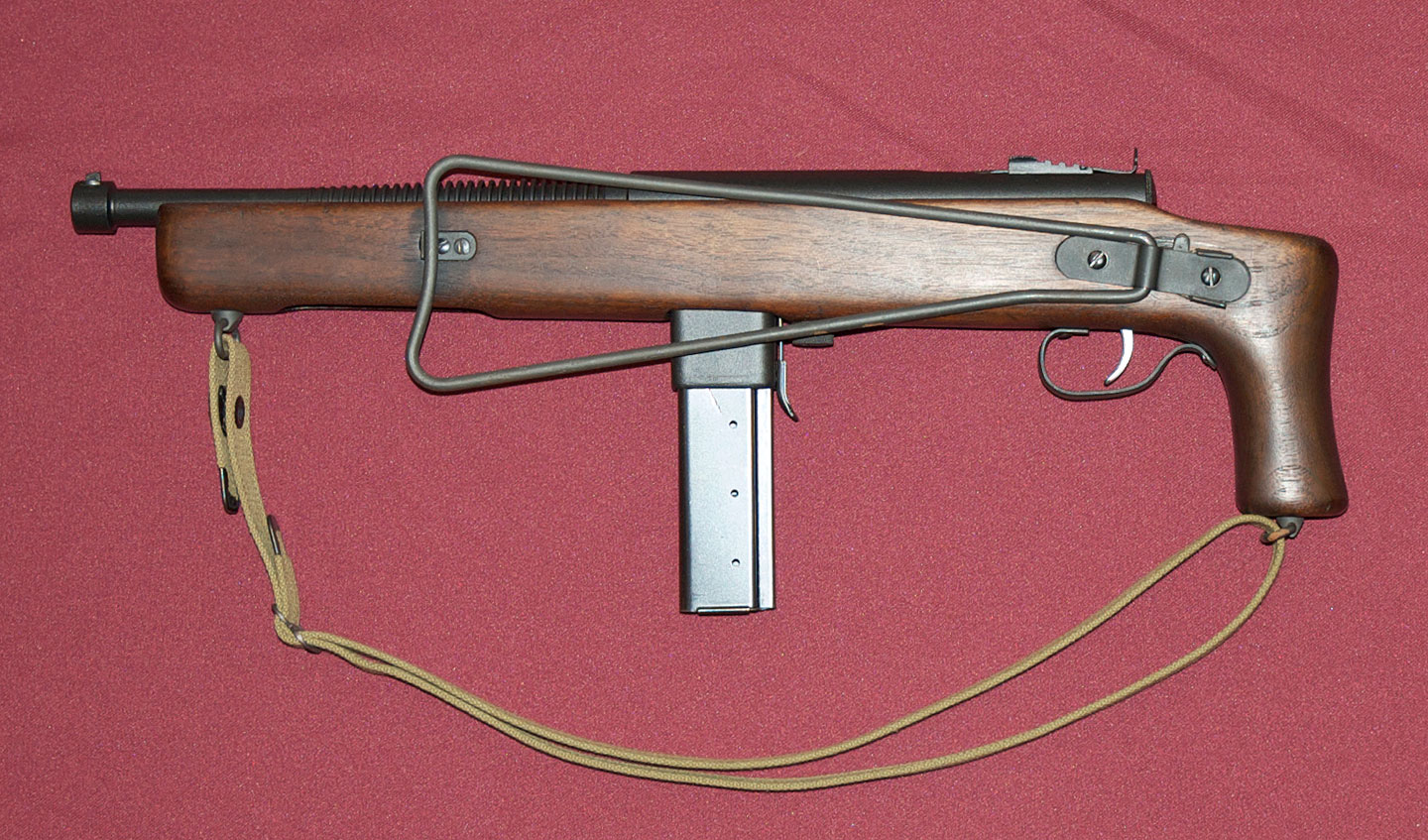
Reising Model 55 with wire stock folded

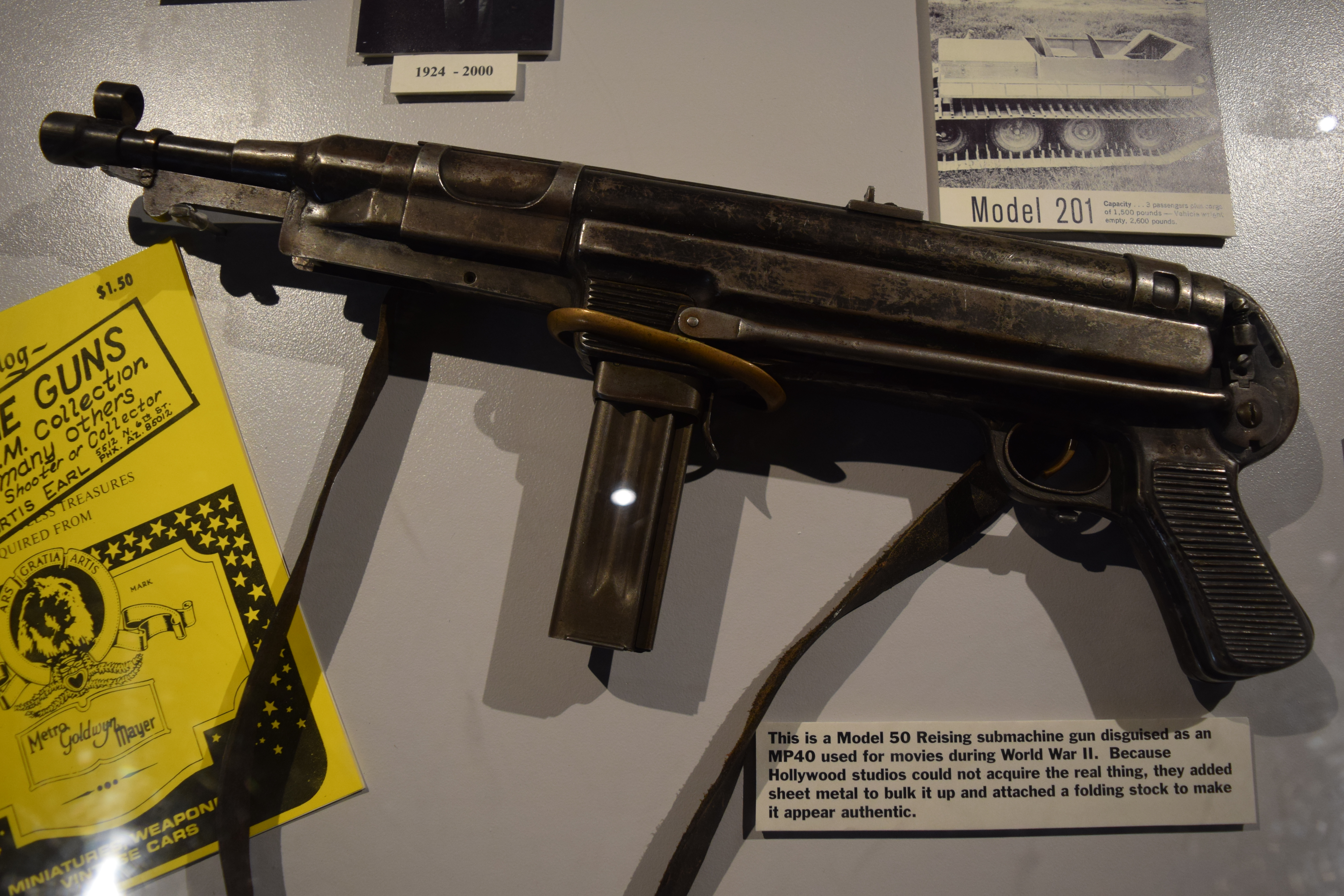
Reising M50 with a stock made to imitate a MP40 for movie productions

There were two differences between the M50 and the M55, those being the elimination of the compensator and the addition of a folding wire buttstock making the M55 lighter and shorter. M55 was originally issued to Marine parachute infantry and armored vehicle crews.

The M60 was a long-barreled, semi-automatic carbine model designed primarily for military training and police use. However, few of these were ever sold. The Marines used M60s for training, guard duty, and other non-combat roles. Some M60s were believed to have been issued to Marine officers at Guadalcanal. The remaining guns were passed on to State Guards and civilian law enforcement agencies. The M65 was developed as a sub-caliber training rifle version of the M60, produced only from 1944 to 1946. H&R later made updates to the M65 and sold them on the civilian market (and to the Marines in small numbers) as the MC-58 and M150/151/165 Leatherneck.

=== H&R Reising light rifle ===
From the submachine gun the .30 carbine light rifle prototype was developed, it was competing to become the M1 carbine but lost to Winchester. While sharing many parts with the submachine gun the light rifle uses a gas piston, it was built in semi-automatic and fully automatic versions and issued with a 12-round magazine.

== USMC deployment ==
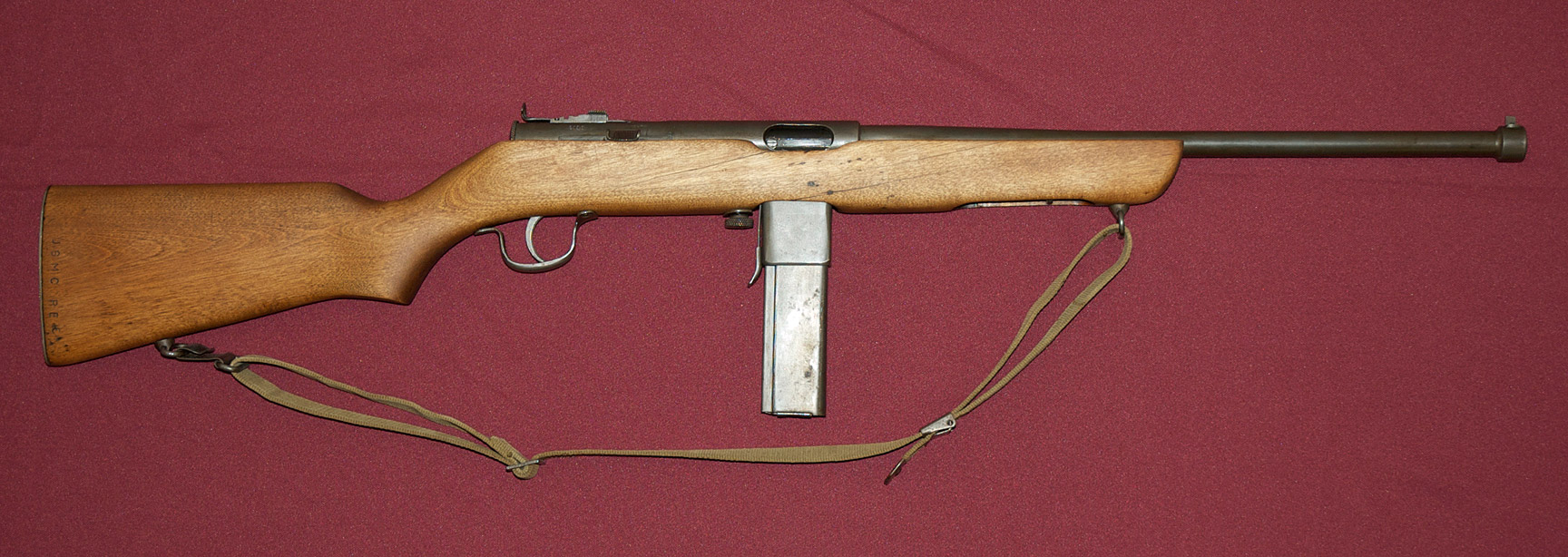
USMC Reising Model 60 carbine

The Reising entered military service primarily because of uncertainty of supply of sufficient quantities of the Thompson submachine gun. In the testing stage, it won out over some other competing designs. It was very light and quite accurate in aimed fire, and "capable of intensive fire against personnel within a range of 300 yards." This was attributed to its better stock fit and intricate closed bolt, delayed blowback design. Most submachine guns fire from the open bolt position, meaning the full mass of the bolt slams forward when the trigger is pulled; with the closed-bolt system employed by the Reising there is much less movement involving far lighter components, and the resulting improved control in the moment before shooting gives better accuracy, both for semi-automatic and at the onset of full automatic fire. Less advantageously though, this more accurate firepower was somewhat limited due to the 20-round capacity of its largest magazine.

The U.S. Marines adopted the Reising in 1941 with 4,200 authorized per division with approximately 500 authorized per each infantry regiment. Most Reisings were originally issued to Marine officers and NCOs in lieu of a compact and light carbine, since the newly introduced M1 carbine was not yet being issued to the Marines. Although the Thompson submachine gun was available, this weapon frequently proved too heavy and bulky for jungle patrols, and initially it, too, was in short supply.

During World War II, the Reising first saw action on August 7, 1942, exactly eight months to the day after Pearl Harbor, when 11,000 men from the 1st Marine Division stormed the beaches of Guadalcanal, in the Solomon Islands. The same date of Guadalcanal's invasion, the Model 50 and 55 saw action with the 1st Marine Raiders on the small outlying islands of Tulagi and Tanambogo to the north. Two companies of Marine paratroopers also used Model 55s, to attack the island of Gavutu, between Tulagi and Tanambogo. Paramarines and armored crewmen were issued the folding stock M55, and this version included a notable flaw: its wire-frame stock was poorly designed, crude and flimsy, and had a tendency to fold while firing. Moreover, other serious shortcomings in both guns were becoming apparent. The reality was that the Reising was designed as a civilian police weapon and was not suited to the stresses of harsh battle conditions encountered in the Solomon Islands—namely, sand, saltwater that easily rusted the commercial blued finish, and the difficulty in keeping the weapon clean enough to function properly. Tests at Aberdeen Proving Ground and at Fort Benning, Georgia, had found difficulties in blindfold reassembly of the Reising, indicating the design was complicated and difficult to maintain.

The producer, H&R, had not yet mastered mass-production technologies in 1940–1941, and many of the parts were hand fitted at the factory just like the company did with their commercial firearms; this lack of parts interchangeability was not a problem for a civilian security or police firearm, and the Marines had to accept it in order to get the weapons quickly, but it was very problematic when Reisings were maintained in the field under combat conditions; the Marines were not told not to mix up the parts during communal cleaning, as they were used to.

While more accurate than the Thompson, particularly in semi-automatic mode, the Reising had a tendency to jam. The problem with the Reising's form of delayed blowback was the recess in which the bolt lodged when in battery. If this accumulated dirt or fouling these could prevent the bolt from seating in it properly; and if this happened the trigger disconnector automatically prevented firing. In addition, the magazine was a staggered-column, single-cartridge feed design, and slight damage to the feed lips or debris in the magazine would render the magazine unusable. A partial solution to the magazine problem was the later introduction of a single-column magazine that reduced the capacity from 20 to 12 rounds.

The Reising earned a dismal reputation for reliability in the combat conditions of Guadalcanal. The M1 carbine eventually became available and was often chosen over both the Reising and the Thompson in the wet tropical conditions, as the M1928 Thompson's built-in oiling pads in the receiver were a liability.

== Withdrawal from the Fleet Marine Force ==
In late 1943 following numerous complaints, the Reising was withdrawn from Fleet Marine Force (FMF) units and assigned to Stateside guard detachments and ship detachments. After the Marines proved reluctant to accept more Reisings, and with the increased issue of the .30-caliber M1 carbine, the U.S. government passed some Reising submachine guns to the OSS and to various foreign governments (as Lend-Lease aid). Canada purchased some Model 50 SMGs and these were issued to 2nd Battalions in Canada where the 1st Battalions of regiments were serving overseas. They were issued along with .30-06 M1917 Enfields and .30-06 Lewis machine guns. One such unit to receive them was the 2nd Bn, Seaforth Highlanders of Canada. The Veteran's Guard of Canada were issued the weapon to guard German prisoners of war. Others were given to various anti-Axis resistance forces operating around the world.

Many Reisings (particularly the semiautomatic M60 rifle) were issued to State Guards for guarding war plants, bridges, and other strategic resources. After the war, thousands of Reising Model 50 submachine guns were acquired by state, county, and local U.S. law enforcement agencies. The weapon proved much more successful in this role, in contrast to its wartime reputation.

== Issues of reliability ==
The Reising's close tolerances and delicate magazine proved unreliable in the sand and mud of the Solomons, unless kept scrupulously clean. The gun quickly became despised by front-line Marines, and Lieutenant Colonel Merritt A. Edson, Commander, 1st Marine Raider Battalion, ordered that his troops' Reisings be flung into Guadalcanal's crocodile-infested Lunga River, as his troops resorted to reliable bolt-action M1903 Springfield rifles.

This failure made a mockery of H&R's company slogan, "Six-and-one-half pounds of controlled dynamite. The H&R Reising will get a bullet there when you need it!"

There are other reasons for its failure. Foremost was the Reising's complex design of many small pins, plungers, springs and levers. Disassembly and assembly was difficult even under normal conditions. Simple maintenance was problematic as there was no bolt hold-open device. Chambering a cartridge was awkward as the action bar was hard to grasp in the forearm and could be obstructed by the sling. Worse, the safety/selector switch could not be sensed by feel at night if it was in the safe, semi, or automatic position.

"Filing-to-fit" of certain parts during production limited interchangeability. The exposed rear sight had no protective ears and was vulnerable to breakage. The adjustable front sight could be lost if the retaining screw was not tightly secured. The weapon was susceptible to jamming if grime clogged the bolt's locking recess in the receiver. The two small magazine guide retaining pins and corresponding receiver stud holes were tapered allowing disassembly and assembly only from one direction—right to left for disassembly, and left to right for assembly; adding unacceptable levels of complexity in a combat environment. The retaining pins had to be delicately tapped out whenever the bolt needed to be removed for cleaning; again, an awkwardly involved task whilst under fire. And afterwards when the pins had to be put back during the reassembly process, if they were inserted either too far or not far enough, the receiver might not fit back into the tight confines of the stock.

== Model confusion ==
What constitutes a "commercial" and "military" Model 50 is amorphous. First, H&R never made a distinction; the distinction is made by collectors. This confusion stems from a period in production where early Model 50s were manufactured with commercial characteristics and H&R's wartime practice of randomly installing old parts in stock throughout production.

While there is not one factor that distinguishes the so-called commercial from the military model, the commercial model is usually blued. It commonly has a fixed front sight and a rear sight with no retaining screw. It often has 28 fins on the barrel, a one piece magazine release, no outward flanges on the safety/selector switch, and no sling swivels. Lastly, the commercial model commonly has a smooth take-down screw, a two-hole trigger guard, and serial numbers ranging from one to 20,000.

Military Reisings are usually parkerized. They often have an adjustable front sight with an Allen screw and a rear sight with a retaining screw. They routinely have 14 fins on the barrel, a two-piece magazine release, outward flanges on the safety/selector switch, sling swivels, stock ties (crossbolts through the forearm), and a knurled take-down screw. Finally, the military model commonly has a three-hole trigger guard, proofmarks like "PH" or "Pm2" above the chamber, and serial numbers ranging from 20,000 to 120,000.

There are three types of H&R magazines. The first and second models are both smooth body, are blued, and are twenty-shot double column. The first model is distinguished by five cartridge peep holes on the left side, a feature eliminated on the second model to prevent mud and sand from entering. In contrast, the third model is parkerized, has two long indentations on the sides to reduce its capacity to a twelve-shot single column magazine because of feeding problems experienced with former models.

== Postwar ==
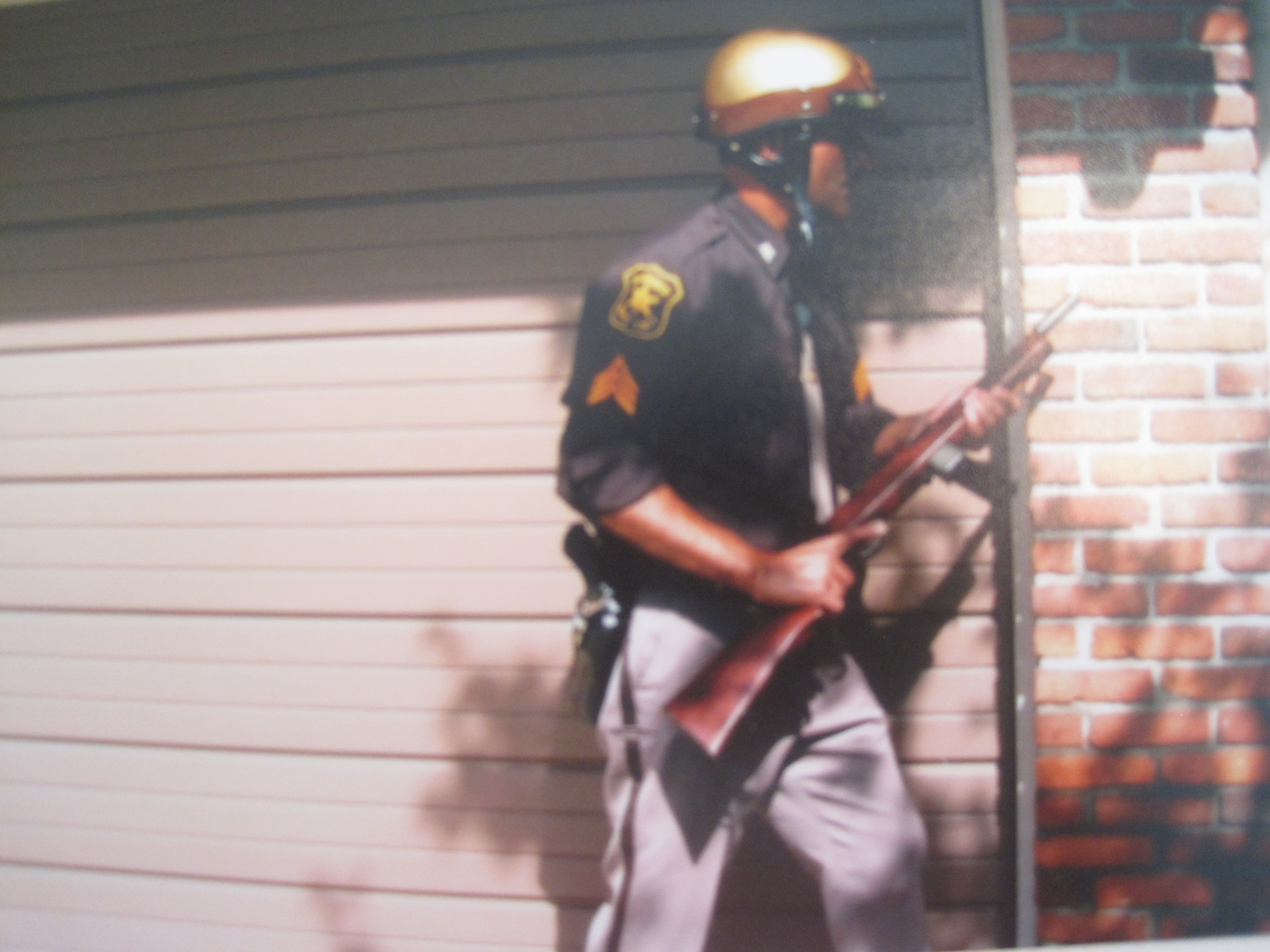
Deputy sheriff with Reising M50

Production of the Model 50 and 55 submachine guns ceased in 1945 at the end of World War II. Nearly 120,000 submachine guns were made of which two-thirds went to the Marines. H&R continued production of the Model 60 semiautomatic rifle in hopes of domestic sales, but with little demand, production of the Model 60 stopped in 1949 with over 3,000 manufactured. H&R sold their remaining inventory of submachine guns to police and correctional agencies across America who were interested in the Reising's selective-fire capability, semi-auto accuracy, and low cost relative to a Thompson. Then, faced with continued demand, H&R resumed production of the Model 50 in 1950 which sputtered to a halt in 1957 with nearly 5,500 additional submachine guns manufactured. But just when the Reising story seemed to end, a final foreign order was received in the 1960s for nearly 2,000 more Model 60s.

Decades later, in 1986, H&R closed their doors and Numrich Arms (aka Gun Parts Corporation) purchased their entire inventory. Acquiring a number of Model 50 receivers, Numrich assembled them with parts. These weapons all have an "S" preceding the serial number and were sold domestically in the early 1990s after reparkerization and fitting with newly manufactured walnut stocks. These stocks are distinguished from originals by their wider than normal sling swivels and buttstocks, by the fact they have no stock ties, and have H&R marked plastic buttplates (originals were unmarked metal).

== Machine gun murders ==
In New Zealand in December 1963, two men thought to have been operating an illegal beerhouse business were murdered execution-style with a Reising submachine gun. At the time, machine guns were not thought to be in the hands of civilians in the country.

== Users ==
- Argentina
- Australia
- Brazil: The Rio de Janeiro Civil Police bought a number of H&R Reising M50s after WW2; these weapons were in use until the mid-1990s.
- Canada
- Costa Rica
- Dominican Republic
- French Indochina: 4,000 ordered, delivery and issue not confirmed.
- Finland: Captured from the Red Army.
- Indonesia: Used by the Indonesian Army.
- Iran
- Malaya: Obtained from Malayan Communist Party militia.
- Mexico
- Nazi Germany: Captured Reisings from the Red Army designated as the Maschinenpistole 762(r). Captured Reisings from the American Army designated as the Maschinenpistole 762(a).
- New Zealand
- Soviet Union: Received in the form of Lend-Lease aid.
- Panama: Used by the Panama National Guard
- Philippines: Used by the Filipino guerrillas and irregular forces during World War II and Philippine Army and Philippine Constabulary after World War II and into the 1960s.
- Union of South Africa
- United States
- United Kingdom: Used by civilians in Malaya
- Uruguay: Used by the Uruguayan Navy
- Venezuela

== Bibliography ==
- Ankony, Robert C. "The US .45 Model 50 and 55 Reising Submachine Gun and Model 60 Semiautomactic Rifle." Small Arms Review, Jul. 2008, pp. 64–67.
- Dunlap, Roy F., Ordnance Went Up Front, Samworth Press, 1948
- George, John (Lt. Col.), Shots Fired in Anger, Samworth Press, 1948
- Jones, Charles, "Lore of the Corps: Reisings Found to be Unreliable in Combat," ArmyTimes.com article
- Leckie, Robert, Helmet For My Pillow, Random House, 1957.
- Nelson, Thomas B., The World's Submachine Guns, TBN Enterprises, 1963
- Hogg, Ian V. and Weeks, John, Military Small Arms of the 20th Century, DBI Books, 1985
- Iannamico, Frank. The Reising Submachine Gun Story, Moose Lake Publishing, 1999
- Iannamico, Frank. United States Submachine Guns. Moose Lake Publishing, 2004
