= Harrington & Richardson =

Firearms brand

Harrington & Richardson Arms Company
- Type: Subsidiary
- Industry: Firearms
- Founded: 1871; 155 years ago
- Defunct: February 27, 2015; 11 years ago
- Headquarters: West Columbia, South Carolina
- Key people: Nathan Harrington; William Augustus Richardson; George F. Brooks
- Products: Single-shot, pump-action, and semi-auto shotguns; Single-shot rifles; Muzzle-loading rifles; Revolvers; Single-shot target pistols
- Website: H&R Website

Harrington & Richardson Arms Company (H&R) is an American brand of firearms and a subsidiary of JJE Capital Holdings. H&R ceased independent production February 27, 2015. JJE - H&R, LLC continues to offer a variety of H&R and H&R 1871 products which are manufactured at their headquarters and production facility in West Columbia, SC.

== History ==
The original H&R firm was in business for over a century from 1871 to 1986.

Frank Wesson, brother of Daniel B. Wesson who co-founded Smith & Wesson, started a firearms manufacturing firm in 1859, sharing an early patent with Nathan Harrington. Wesson produced two trigger rifles and spur trigger pistols and pocket rifles/shotguns popular for short length holster models such as the discontinued Topper compact pocket shotguns. He started a brief partnership in 1871 with Harrington's nephew Gilbert Henderson Harrington, as Wesson & Harrington, until Harrington bought him out in 1874.

In 1875 Harrington and another former Wesson employee, William Augustus Richardson, formed the new Harrington & Richardson Company. In 1888 the firm was incorporated as The Harrington & Richardson Arms Company. Their original capital investment was $75,000. Harrington was president, Richardson was treasurer, and George F. Brooks was secretary. After the deaths of Harrington and Richardson in 1897, Brooks became the manager and the company was held by heirs Edwin C. Harrington (Gilbert Harrington's son) and Mary A. Richardson (William Richardson's wife).

In 1894 the company opened a new facility on Park Avenue in Worcester, Massachusetts. The factory was expanded again after a few years. Original rifles and shotguns from these dates are scarce because of their limited production and discontinued parts.

In 1950 the company opened a new facility on Cockburn street in Drummondville, Québec, Canada.

In the 1960s H&R was acquired by the Kidde corporation and run by the Rowe family. Warranty cards were sent to 'Industrial Rowe', Gardner, Massachusetts. The original H&R company went out of business in 1986, and the building was demolished.

A new company, H&R 1871, Inc., was formed in 1991 and started production of revolvers, single-shot rifles and shotguns using original H&R designs. H&R 1871, Inc. assets were subsequently sold to H&R 1871, LLC., a Connecticut LLC owned by Marlin Firearms Company in November 2000. H&R 1871, LLC. did not extend their product warranty to H&R guns made prior to the LLC's takeover.

Marlin, including all its H&R assets, was later acquired by Remington Arms Company in December, 2007. H&R 1871, LLC production was moved to Ilion, N.Y. (the site of Remington's original manufacturing plant) in late 2008, while their corporate offices are co-located with Remington Arms in Madison, N.C. (HR1871.com and Remington.com). Remington, along with its Marlin and H&R subsidiaries (New England Firearms and L.C. Smith), were now part of the Remington Outdoor Company. H&R 1871 production ceased 27 February 2015.

In the bankruptcy auction of Remington Outdoor Company the company was sold to JJE Capital Holdings, LLC. As of September 2020, this sale, however, still needs court approval. JJE currently owns several firearms manufacturing companies, including Lead Star Arms and Palmetto State Armory. Palmetto State Armory social media, website and a recent article in Guns Digest, Palmetto State Armory has been offering semi-automatic variations of H&R's AR-15 type rifles, and will soon be offering a semi-automatic H&R M14 type rifle for sale.

== Locations ==
- The Wesson & Harrington company was at 18 Manchester Street, Worcester, Mass., from 1871 until 1877.
- The Harrington & Richardson company was located at 31 Hermon Street, Worcester, Mass., from 1877 until 1894.
- William Richardson lived at 921 Main Street in Worcester.

Some of the other factory addresses that Harrington & Richardson has used:

- Harrington & Richardson Arms Co., 243 Park Ave, Worcester, Mass.
- Harrington & Richardson Arms Co., 320 Park Ave, Worcester, Mass.
- Harrington & Richardson Arms Co., 439 Park Ave, Worcester, Mass.
- Harrington & Richardson Arms Co., 484 Park Ave, Worcester, Mass.
- H&R 1871, Inc., 60 Industrial Rowe, Gardner, Mass.
- H&R 1871, LLC., P.O. Box 1871, Madison, N.C. 27025 (corporate offices)
- H&R 1871, LLC. 14 Hoefler Ave, Ilion, N.Y. 13357 (production facilities)

== Military contributions ==
H&R built flare guns during World War I and a variety of military firearms during WW 2 including the Reising submachine gun, and a.22 cal training rifle for the USMC called the Leatherneck in several models. H&R was granted a contract to produce the M1 rifle during the Korean War, but the first deliveries of the rifles were not made until after the armistice. H&R was the exclusive manufacturer of the US test version of the FN FAL, designated the T48 rifle, in the trials to select a replacement service rifle for the M1 Garand, but the US Army Ordnance Department instead adopted the M1-derived T44 as "US Rifle M-14", awarding H&R one of three contracts to produce the M14 rifle during that rifle's production cycle (1959–1964). H&R also manufactured M16A1 rifles during the Vietnam War and is one of only four manufacturers (along with Colt, Fabrique Nationale, & GM Hydramatic Division) to have ever made an official M16 variant for the U.S. Military. Due to their relative scarcity, all H&R military weapons are considered highly desirable by collectors.

== Miscellaneous ==
- The firm was named sole North American licensee for England's Anson & Deeley double-barrel hammerless shotgun.
- In 1932, an H&R pistol was used to set a new U.S. pistol record and went on to become the most famous firearm of its kind—the U.S.R.A. single-shot target pistol. This pistol was so accurate that it was adopted by the U.S. Army Pistol Team.

== Handcuff patents ==
- Patent #1984677 Patented December 18, 1934; assigned to H&R Arms Co.
- Patent #1572262 Patented February 9, 1926; assigned to H&R Arms Co.
- Patent #2388766 Patented November 13, 1945; assigned to H&R Arms Co.

== Products ==
=== Cartridges ===
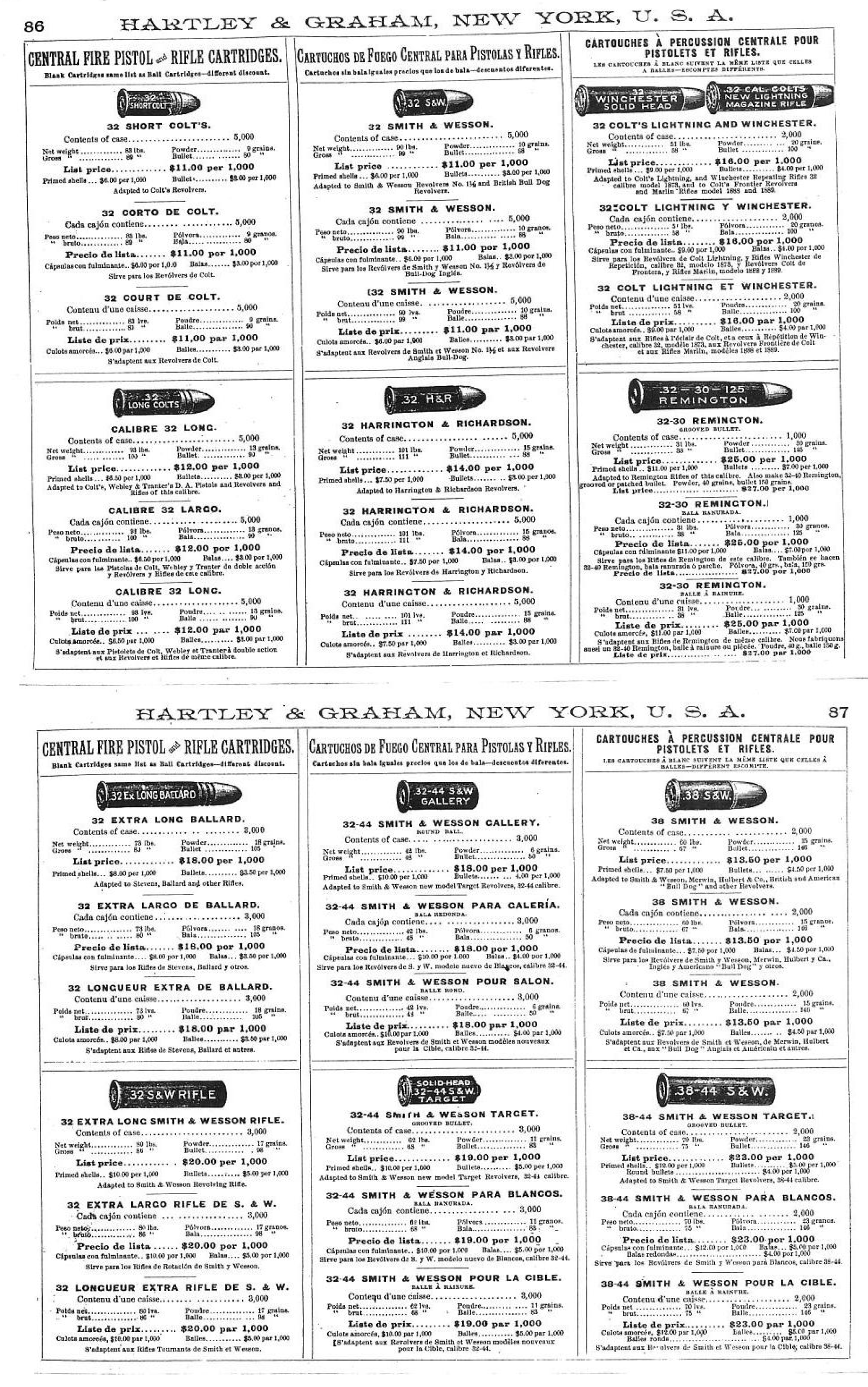
1889 Hartley & Graham Catalog, .32 cal central fire cartridges, marketing the .32 Harrington & Richardson Cartridge. Note the charge of 15 grains of black powder under an 88 grain projectile, and the groove depicted on the bullet just outside of the neck of the case. The .32 S&W Long is not depicted here as it was invented until 1896.

In the mid-1880s, Harrington & Richardson developed the proprietary 32 Harrington & Richardson (.32 H&R) cartridge for their large frame 6-shot.32 cal revolvers, specifically the Manual Ejecting and Automatic Ejection Double Action Revolvers. The 32 H&R cartridge was dimensionally longer than many other contemporary.32 caliber pistol cartridges, including the .32 S&W, .32 Short Colt, and .32 Long Colt, and was loaded with a stout 15 grains of black powder over an 88 grain projectile (compared to the 10 grain charge of the contemporary.32 S&W, or the 13 grain charge of the contemporary.32 Long Colt). This hot loading at the time made the.32 H&R almost as powerful as the .32-20 Winchester rifle cartridge. The cartridge can also be identified by a distinct groove cut into the lead bullet just outside of the neck of the case.

Like the .32 Long Colt, The black powder.32 H&R was eventually rendered obsolete by the popularity of the .32 S&W Long introduced in 1896 and the development of smokeless powders. Note that the black powder.32 H&R developed in the 1880s should not be confused with the modern smokeless powder .32 H&R Magnum, developed over 100 years later in 1984.

In 1983, Harrington & Richardson worked with Federal Cartridge Company to jointly develop the .32 H&R Magnum. The.32 H&R Magnum is produced by lengthening the .32 S&W Long case by .155", to 1.075".

The .32 H&R Magnum offers substantially more performance than most other .32 caliber handgun cartridges, such as the .32 ACP, and is considered an effective small-game hunting cartridge. Its higher velocity offers a flat trajectory, while the light weight of the bullet results in low recoil.

=== Revolvers ===
- Model 1 .32 caliber 7-shot or .38 Caliber 5-shot, spur trigger single-action revolver, 3-inch octagonal barrel, fluted cylinder, flat frame, saw-handle square butt, plain walnut or black checkered rubber grips, marked HARRINGTON & RICHARDSON, WORCESTER, MASS. PAT. MAY 23, 1876. Approximately 3,000 were manufactured in 1877 and 1878.
- Model 1 1/2 .32 Caliber spur trigger, single-action revolver, 5-shot cylinder (10,000 were manufactured between 1878 and 1883)
- Model 2 1/2 same as model 1 1/2 but 3.25-inch barrel and 7-shot cylinder (5,000 were manufactured between 1878 and 1883)
- Model 3 1/2 .38 rimfire Caliber 3.5-inch barrel, 5-shot cylinder (1,000 were manufactured)
- Model 1880 Double Action .32 S&W, or .38 S&W cal; 5- or 6- shot. Solid frame revolver with removable cylinder and fixed ejecting rod under barrel, hard rubber grip panels with Floral design, nickel finish, marked on top of barrel with company name and address only, 3 1/4 in. barrel, modified American Double Action mechanism and frame. Mfg. 1880–1883.
- Young America Double Action (small solid frame centerfire revolver) Manufactured 1884–1941 Calibers: .22 rimfire and .32 Standard barrel length was 2 1/2 inches, with 4 1/2-inch and 5 1/2-inch extra-cost options (1,500,000 were manufactured). First model manufactured 1884–1904 designed for black powder cartridge. Second model manufactured 1905–1941 designed for modern smokeless powder cartridge.
- Young America Bulldog (small solid frame rimfire revolver) Caliber: .32 Rimfire
- Young America Safety Hammer (small solid frame centerfire revolver with bobbed hammer) Safety hammer patented 1887 Calibers: .22 and .32
- Vest-Pocket Self-Cocker (same as Vest Pocket Safety Hammer but without half / full cocking sear) NOTE: Some trigger guards installed on this model had cutouts which would allow the installation of the half / full cocking sear. Early models had a 2 1/2-inch octagonal barrel with front sight, later models incorporated a short 1-inch round barrel, no front sight. Calibers: .22 and .32
- Vest Pocket Safety Hammer (small solid frame centerfire revolver with bobbed hammer and shortened round barrel) Safety hammer patented 1887 Calibers: .22 and .32
- Victor (Unfluted cylinder, round barrel) Available in both small and large frame. Calibers: .22, .32 and .38
- The American Double Action (large solid frame centerfire revolver) Manufactured 1883–1941. Calibers: .32, .38 and .44 (850,000 were manufactured).
- H&R Bulldog (large solid frame rimfire revolver) Caliber: .32 rimfire
- Top-break Shell Extracting Revolver (Manual Ejecting Model) .32 S&W, .32 H&R, or .38 S&W; 5- or 6- shot. Build on the same frame as the Second Model Auto Ejecting, and features a spring-loaded center pin protruding under the barrel that is used to manually actuate the ejector star. 3 1/4 in. barrel, hard rubber grips with target logo, nickel or blue finish, one patent date marking. Mfg. 1886–1888.
- Top-Break Automatic Ejecting Model 1 .32 S&W, .32 H&R, or .38 S&W; 5- or 6- shot; hard rubber grip panels with floral design, 3 1/4 in. barrel, modified American Double Action mechanism and frame, nickel finish, First Variation marked on top of barrel with company name and address only and two guide rods for ejector (1885–1886), Second Variation patent date 10-4-87 marked on top of barrel along with company name and address, extractor does not have extra guide rods (1887–1889). Mfg. 1885–1889.
- Top-Break Automatic Ejecting Model 2 .32 S&W, .32 H&R, or .38 S&W; 5- or 6- shot; improved ejector mechanism and hinge, new frame, nickel finish, hard rubber grips with target logo, 2 1/2 in., 3 1/4 in. 4 in., 5 in., and 6 in. barrel. Marked with patent dates Oct 4 '87, May 14 & Aug 6 '89. Mfg. 1889–1896.
- Top-Break Automatic Ejecting Model 3 .32 S&W, .32 H&R, .32 S&W Long, or .38 S&W; 5- or 6- shot; improved hinge screw, new frame, nickel or blue finish, hard rubber grips with target logo, 2 1/2 in., 3 1/4 in. 4 in., 5 in., and 6 in. barrel. Early variations marked with patent dates May 14 Aug 6 '89, April 2 '95, April 7 '96; later variations removed patent dates and marked caliber on the barrel. Later smokeless powder variations can be identified by a cartridge marking on the left of the barrel. Mfg. 1896–1940.
- Premier Model .22 Rimfire 7-shots, .32 S&W 5-shots. Small frame double action revolver, with "PREMIER" or "H.&R. PREMIER" marked on the left side of the barrel. Introduced in 1895 and discontinued in 1941. The Premier models can be visually distinguished from the Automatic Ejecting models by the addition of long horizontal cylinder stop notches.
- H&R Knife Pistol (.32, .38 manufactured in 1901)
- Safety Hammer Double Action (large solid frame centerfire revolver with bobbed hammer) Safety hammer patented 1887 Calibers: .32, .38 and .44 (manufactured between 1890 and 1941).
- NEF Model R73 (.32 H&R Magnum 5-shot)
- NEF Model R92 (.22 LR 9-shot revolver, .22 WMR 6-shot)
- H&R Sportsman (.22 LR nine-shot revolver 6-inch barrel – blued finish)
- H&R model 532
- H&R model 604 (.22 WMRF six-shot pull pin revolver, Blued, Round barrel)
- H&R model 622 (.22 LR six-shot pull pin revolver)
- H&R model 623 (.22 LR six-shot pull pin revolver, same as 622 but in brushed nickel)
- H&R model 632 (.32 cal)
- H&R model 642 (.22 WMRF six shots)
- H&R model 649 (.22 LR & .22 WMR six-shot, double- or single-action revolver)
- H&R Model 660 Gunfighter (.22LR Revolver, Made in the 1960s)
- H&R Model 666 (.22 LR or .22 WMR, double-action with 6-inch barrel and 6-shot cylinder. Blued w/plastic grips. Manufactured from 1976 to 1982.)
- H&R Model 676 (.22 LR & .22 WMR, double-action with 4-1/2, 5-1/2, 7-1/2 & 12-inch barrel and 6-shot cylinder. Blued w/wood grips. Manufactured from 1976 to 1980.)
- H&R model 686 (.22 LR & .22 MAG)
- H&R model 700
- H&R model 722 (.22 LR, single-action with 6-inch octagonal barrel and 7-shot cylinder. Blued w/wood grips. Formally known as the "Trapper" model)
- H&R model 732 (.32 long six-shot swing cylinder)
- H&R model 733 (same as model 732 but in brushed nickel)
- H&R model 777 Ultra Sportsman (.22 LR nine-shot revolver)
- H&R model 829 (.22 LR nine-shot revolver) Swingout 9-shot cylinder, double- or single-action)
- H&R model 900 (.22 LR nine-shot revolver) Removable 9-shot cylinder, double- or single action, 2 1/2", 4", and 6" barrels available
- H&R model 904 (.22 LR nine-shot revolver) Swingout 9-shot cylinder, double-action, barrel came with a rail. Came with a wooden grip.
- H&R model 922 (.22 LR nine-shot revolver)
- H&R model 922-C (.22 LR nine-shot revolver) Same as 922 but with nickel finish.
- H&R model 923 (.22 LR nine-shot revolver)
- H&R model 925 (.32 cal. revolver)
- H&R model 925 "Defender" (.38ctg five-shot revolver 4-inch barrel – blued finish)
- H&R model 926 (.22 WRF nine-shot revolver)
- H&R model 929 (.22 LR nine-shot revolver, blued finish)
- H&R model 930 (.22 LR & nine-shot revolver, nickel finish)
- H&R model 933 Hunter (.22 LR nine-shot revolver, manufactured 1930–1939.)
- H&R model 925 (.38 cal. revolver)
- H&R model 939 Ultra Sidekick (.22 LR double-action revolver) Introduced in 1956.
- H&R model 944 22 Special (.22 LR seven-shot or nine-shot revolver adjustable rear sight, fixed yellow brass front sight)
- H&R model 949 (.22 LR nine-shot revolver)
- H&R model 950 (.22 LR nine-shot revolver, nickel)
- H&R model 999 (.22 LR nine-shot top break revolver)

Note: Pre-1898 solid frame revolvers were designed for use with black powder loads. Using smokeless powder rounds with these revolvers may cause damage to the revolver and/or injury to the user.

Note: Many of the above guns are stamped as "H&R .22 Special"/".22 W.R.F." or ".22 Winchester Rim Fire"

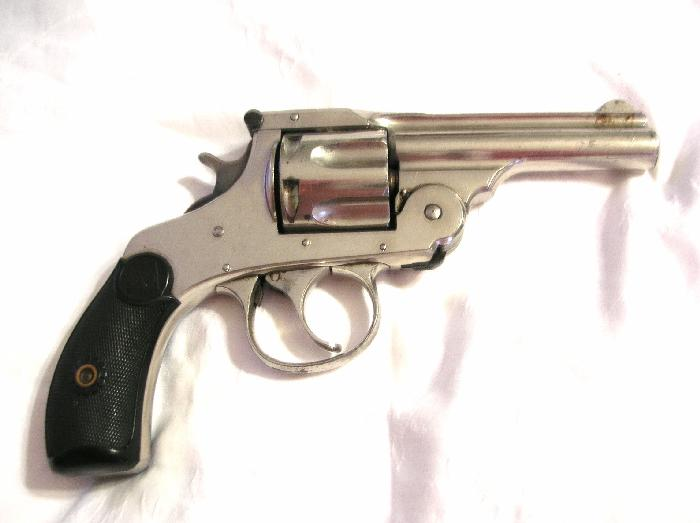
H&R Revolver of Top-Break design

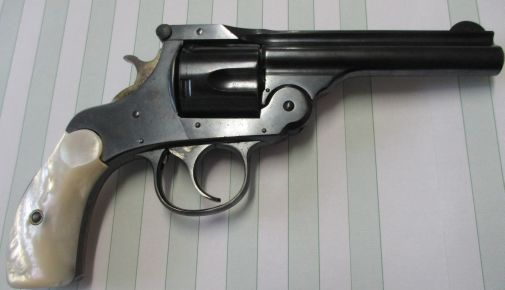
Early break-action model with factory pearl grips.

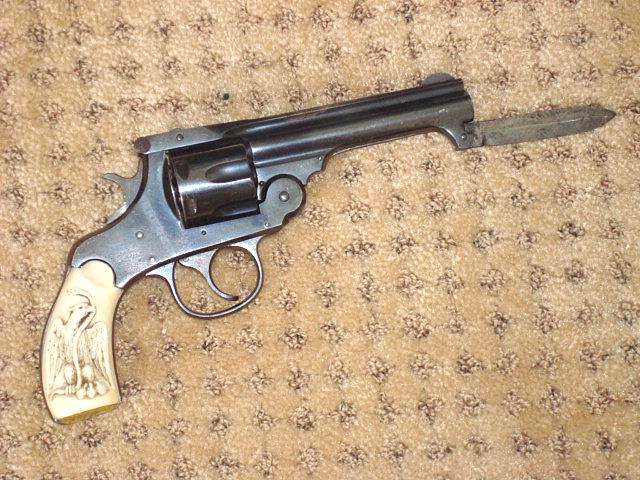
H&R Revolver of Top-Break design with knife

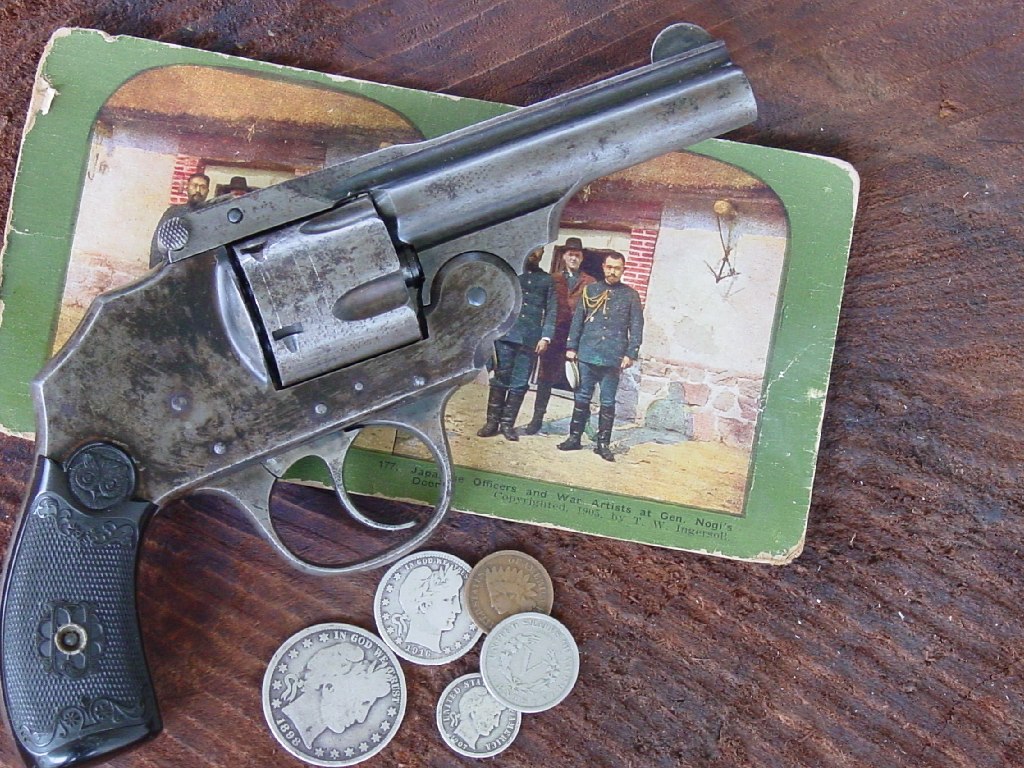
The 3rd model of the .38 S&W H&R Hammerless Safety came out in 1909. Flat springs common to the first two models were replaced with coil wire.

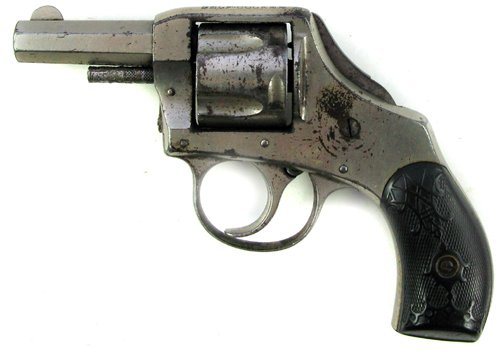
H&R Vest-Pocket Self-Cocker (Early model)

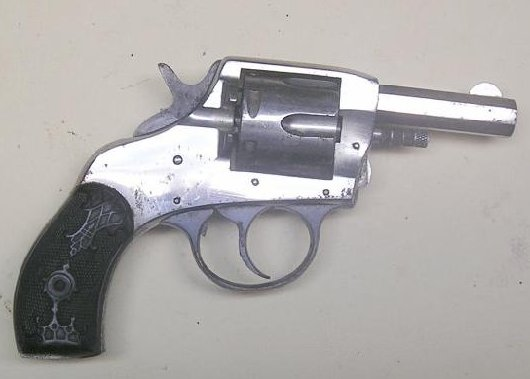
H&R The American Double Action

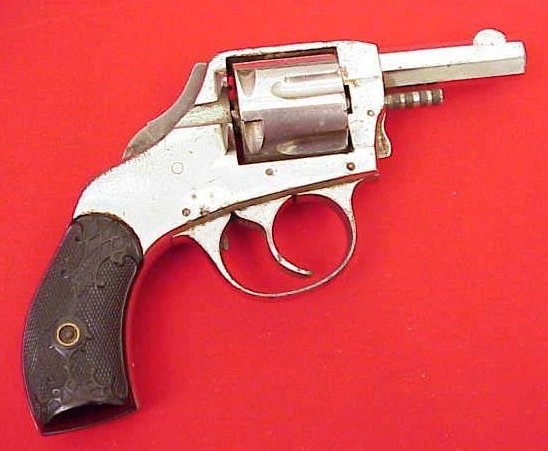
H&R Double Action Safety Hammer

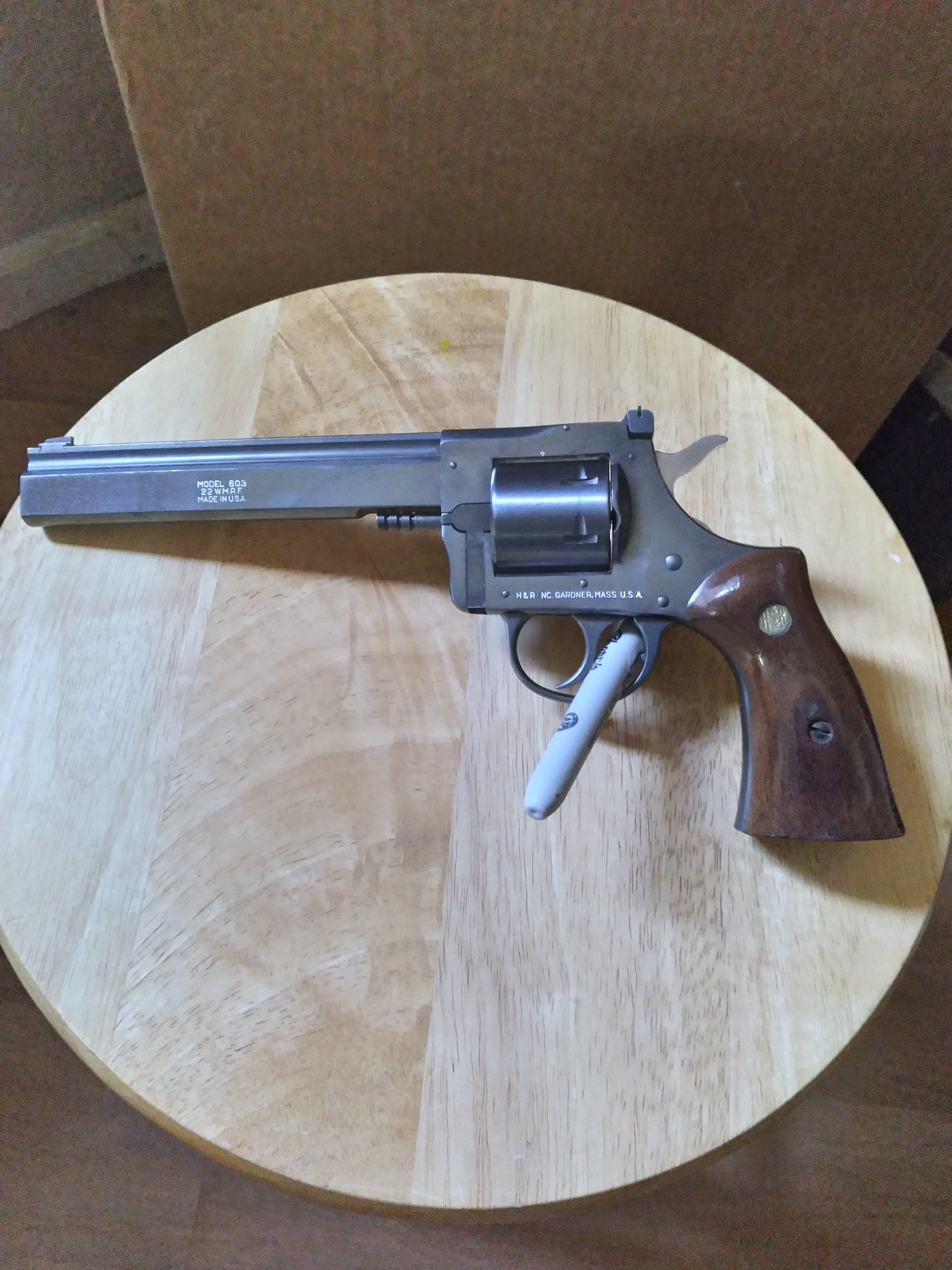
H&R Model 603 in 22 WMR. Made between 1980 and 1983.

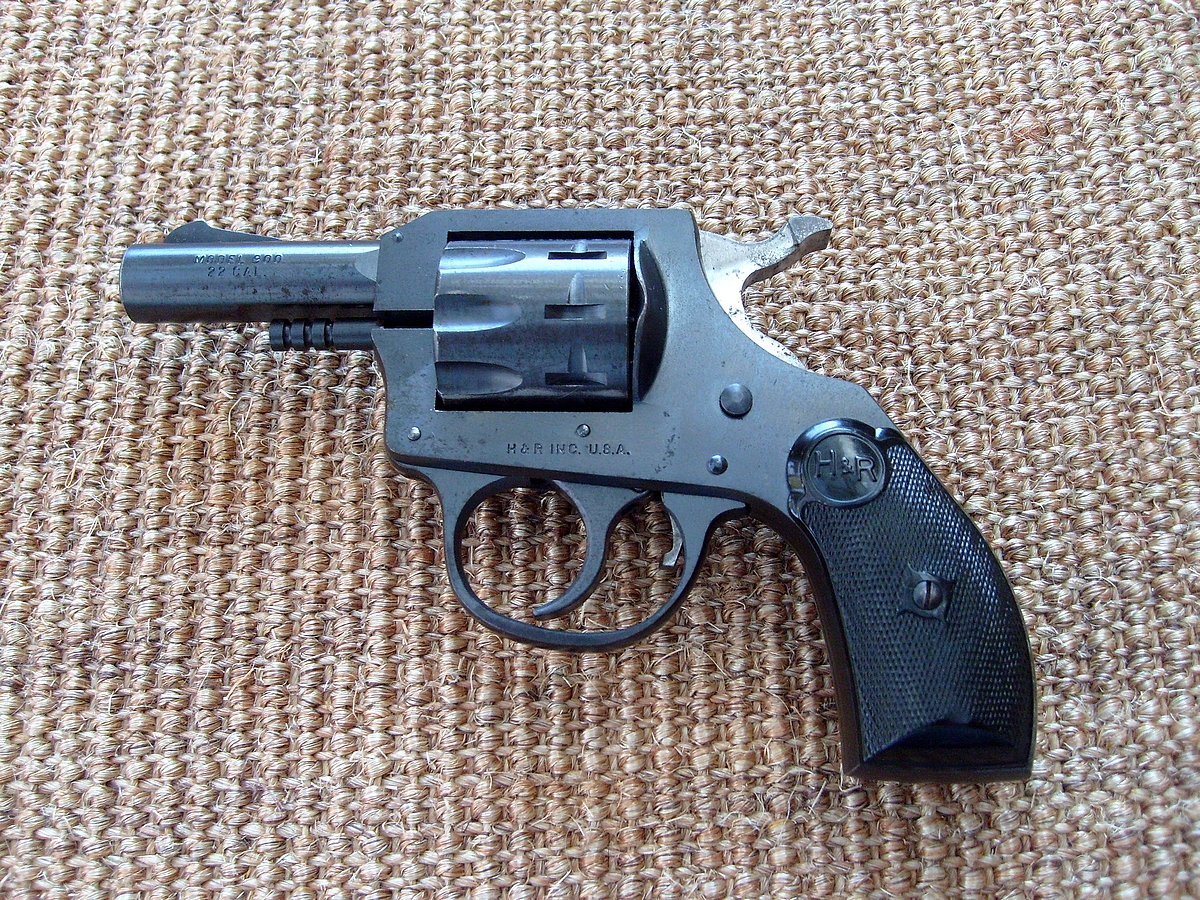
H&R model 900 9-shot .22 Revolver

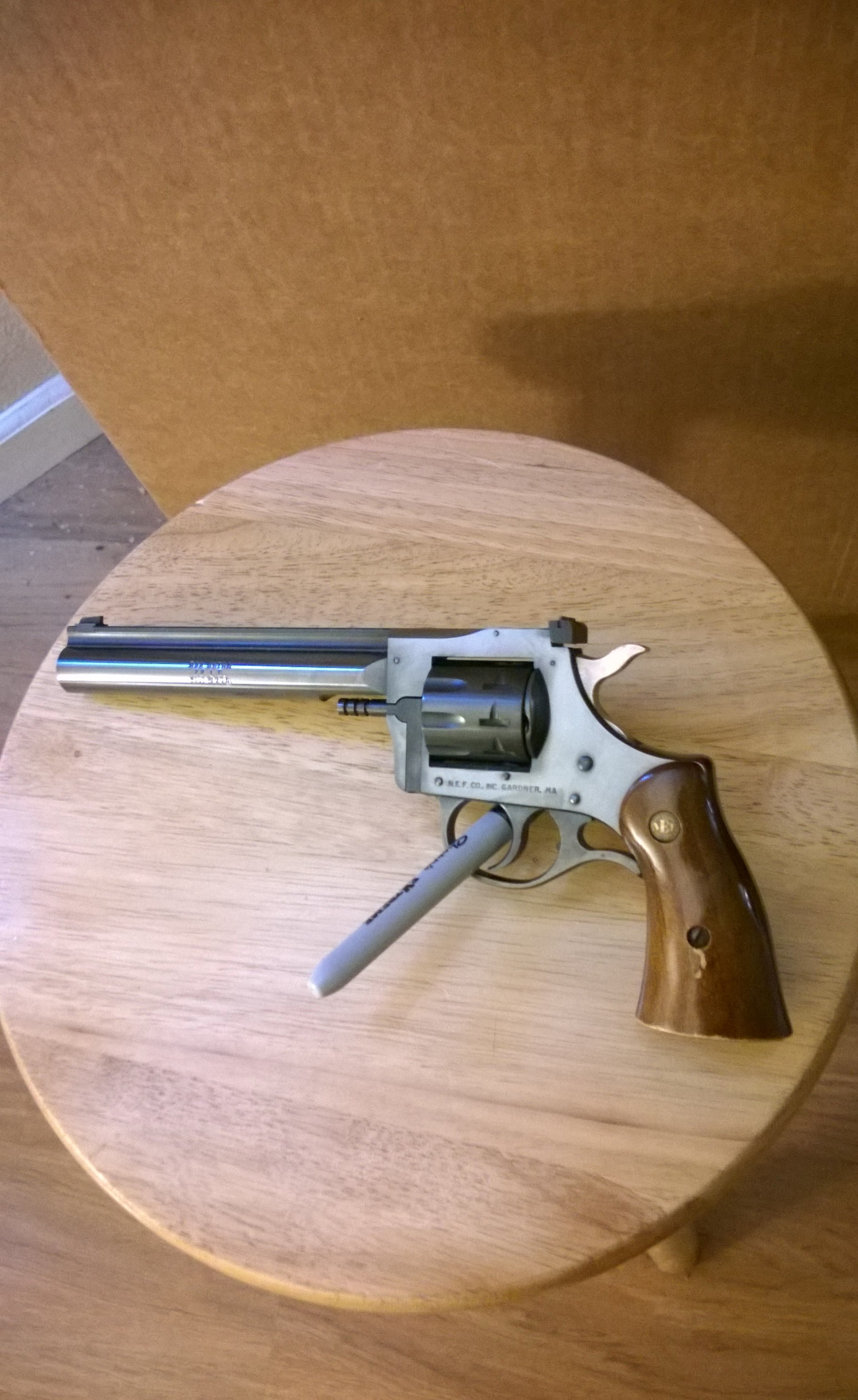
NEF R92 Ultra in .22 LR. Made in 1990.

=== Pistols ===
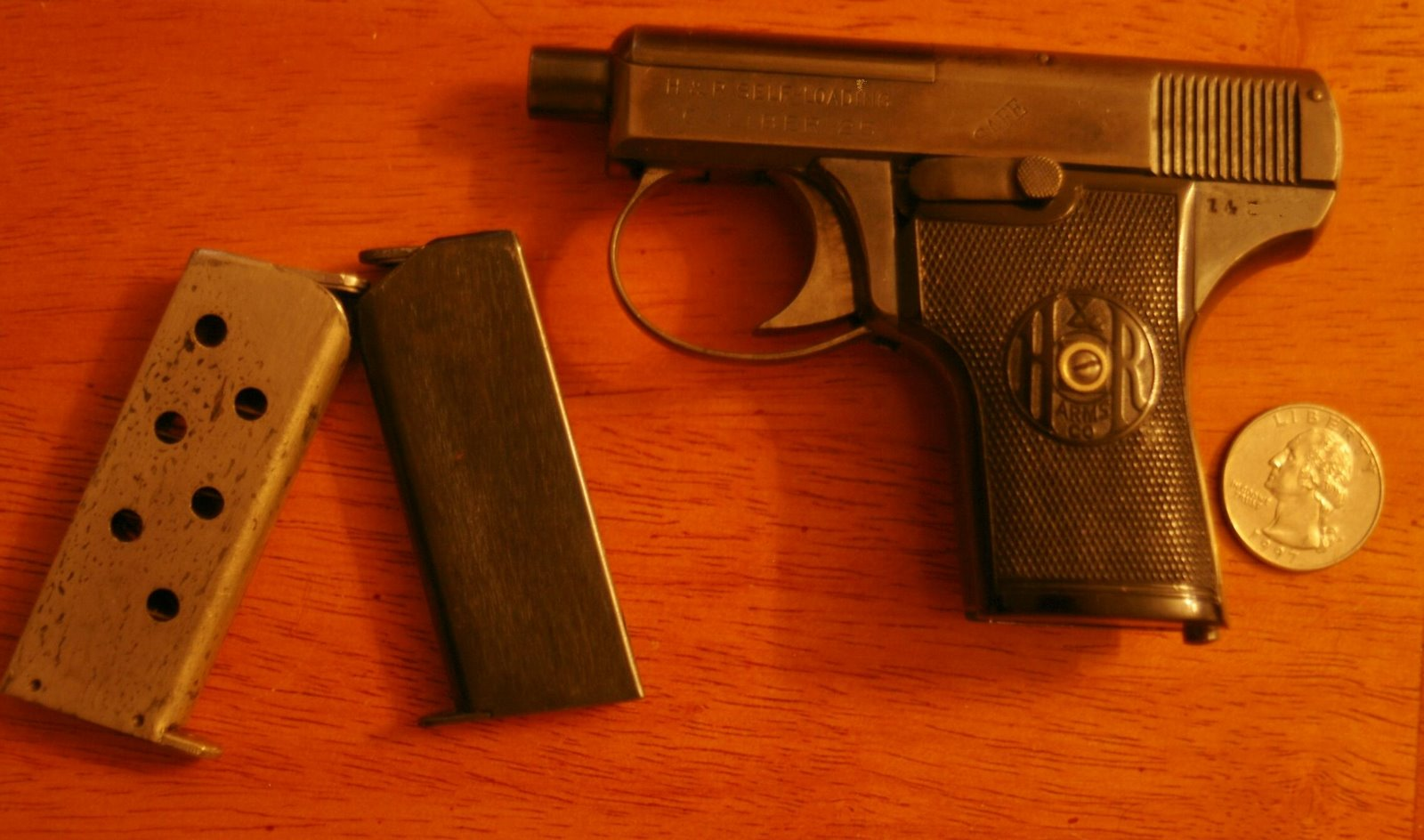
H&R Self-Loading (Automatic) Pistol

- H&R Self-loading (Automatic) Pistol. Calibers .32 ACP and .25 ACP.
- HK4. From 1968 to 1973, Heckler & Koch's HK4 was imported from Germany and sold in the U.S. with Harrington & Richardson model HK4 branding.

=== Handy-Guns ===
H&R Handy Gun

- H&R 'Handy-Gun' (single-shot top-break pistol, .410 bore, 28 gauge, 8-inch or 12 1/4-inch barrel) manufactured 1920–1934
- H&R 'Handy-Gun' (single-shot top-break pistol, .22 rimfire and 32–20, 12 1/4-inch barrel) manufactured 1933–34

=== Shotguns ===
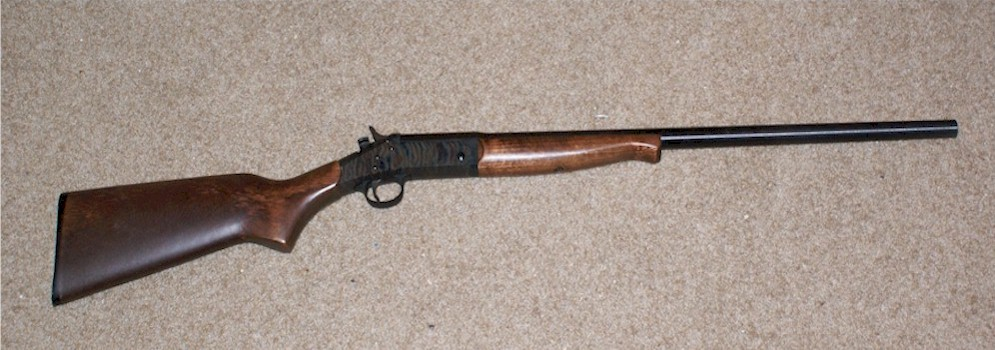
20 GA NEF Pardner shotgun

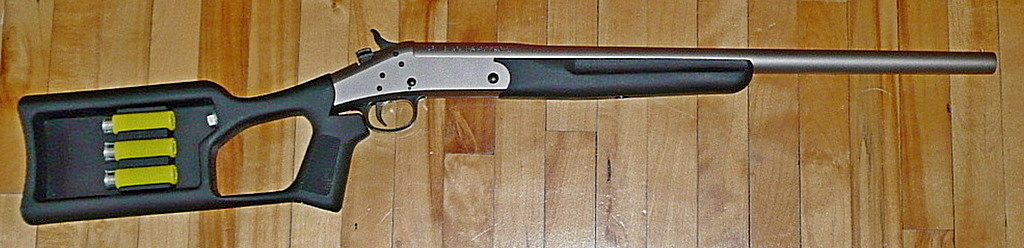
H&R Tamer Shotgun 20 GA

- Pardner shotgun (Single-shot). Available in gauges 10, 12, 16, 20, 28 and in .410 bore. Youth/compact models available in short barrel 8-, 10-, and 12-inch versions prior to 1911, Tamer, and Survivor models available in addition to the standard Pardner.
- Survivor shotgun (Single-shot). Available in .410 bore/.45 Colt only. Available in either a blued finish or an electroless nickel finish with a polymer stock with a thumbhole/pistol-grip design and a convenient storage compartment. Same stock as .308 Winchester Survivor Rifle.
- Tamer shotgun (Single-shot). Also known as the "Snake Tamer" is a Snake Charmer like shotgun. Available in 20 gauge or .410 Bore/.45 Colt only. Available in either a blued finish or an electroless nickel finish with a polymer stock has a thumbhole/pistol-grip design. The right side of the stock is open with storage for three 20 gauge or four .410 bore shotgun shells.
- Topper shotgun (Single-shot). Available in gauges 12, 16, 20, and in .410 bore. Original models of scarce production in Youth/compact short barrel classic models, Deluxe, Classic, and Trap models available in addition to the standard Topper.
- Ultra-Slug shotgun (Single-shot). Gauges 12, 20 available. Rifled barrels. Compact model available with 8, 10, and 12-inch barrel for pre-1911 models. Post 1911 productions not available in compact version.
- Pardner Pump shotgun (Imported). (In production). Branded NEF (New England Firearms). 12 and 20 gauges available. Manufactured by Hawk Industries, China. Youth/compact, Turkey, and Waterfowl models available in addition to the standard Pardner Pump.
- Excell Auto shotgun (Discontinued). Branded NEF (New England Firearms). 12 gauge only. Manufactured in Turkey. There were waterfowl and turkey models in addition to the standard black synthetic Excell. Also came in a combo pack with both a standard and rifled barrel. Came with 4 choke tubes: IC, M, IM and F. Discontinued due to lack of parts availability.
- Pinnacle (Double barrel). (Discontinued).
- Gamester (Bolt action). Gauges 16 and 12. Example: Model 349

=== Rifles ===
- Handi-Rifle (Single-shot): Calibers: .17 HMR, .204 Ruger, .22 LR, .22 WMR, .22-250 Remington, .223 Remington, .22 Hornet, .243 Winchester, .25-06 Remington, .270 Winchester, .280 Remington, 7mm-08 Remington, .308 Winchester, .30-06 Springfield .30-30 Winchester, .300 AAC Blackout, .444 Marlin, .45 LC, .45/70 Government, and .500 S&W. Also available with pairs of handgun/rifled slug barrels in .357 Magnum/20-gauge and .44 Magnum/12-gauge. Standard, Synthetic, Superlight, Ultra Varmint, Ultra Hunter, Buffalo Classic, CR Carbine, and Sportster models available. A version with a 16" threaded barrel chambered in .300 AAC Blackout is made for Advanced Armament Corporation.
- Ultra-Varmint-Rifle (Single-shot): Stock and fore-end are crafted of durable laminated hardwood, and this deadly accurate single shot has a full 24" of bullet-stabilizing bull barrel. Chambered in three popular varmint extinguishers: 223 Remington, 22 WMR and 243 Win.
- Survivor Rifle (Single-shot): available in .223 Winchester and .308 Winchester. Available in either a blued finish or an electroless nickel finish with a polymer stock has a thumbhole/pistol-grip design and a convenient storage compartment. Same stock as .410/45 Survivor Shotgun.
- Sportster (Single-shot): Rimfire design of Handi-Rifle. Available in .17 HMR, .22 LR, and .22 mag.
- H&R 330: Made from 1968 to 1972, this model is an FN Mauser action that Harrington and Richardson bought as surplus and produced into sporterized hunting rifles using Douglas barrels and conventional stocks, chambered in 7mm Remington Magnum.
- H&R M12 5200: A competitor to the Winchester Model 52 series rifle. Bolt action .22 LR single-shot rifle. Featured a heavy 28-inch barrel of blued steel, an oversized, walnut stock with an accessory rail in the fore end.
- H&R Model 700: .22 Magnum semi auto rifle
- H&R Model 765/766 'Pioneer': Produced as the 766 from 1949 to 1950 in a nickel finish while the 765 was made between 1950 and 1951 with a blued finish. .22 S/L/LR, single shot bolt action.
- H&R Model 760 '': .22 LR Produced in 1967,1968 and 1971. single shot automatic.
- H&R Model 155 'Shikari' '': Year of Manufacture: 1973–1981, These were single-shot break available in 12ga, 20ga shotgun barrels along with 44mag, 45-70 government rifle barrels with an under-barrel cleaning rod.
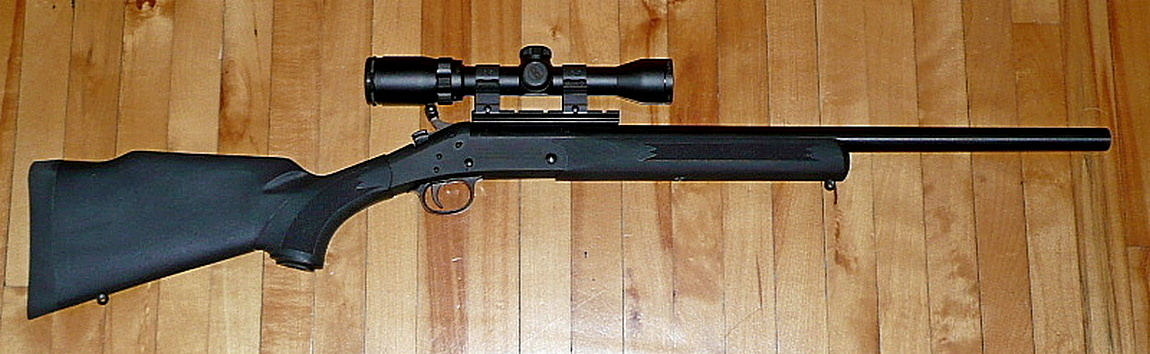
H&R Handi-Rifle .44 Magnum with scope

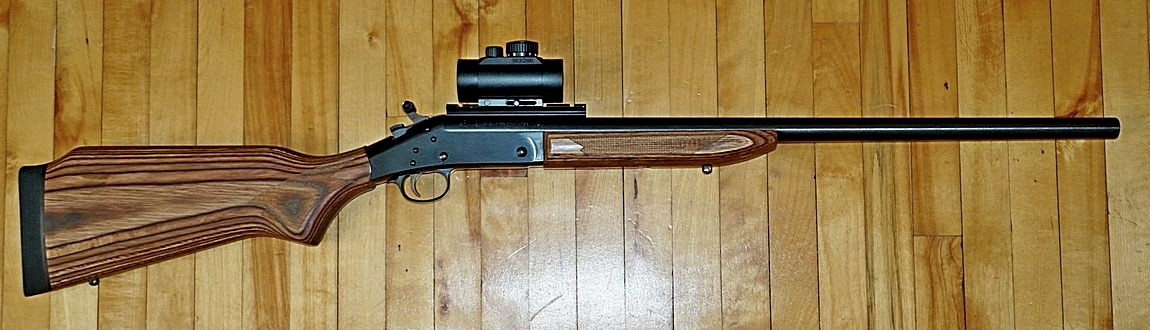
H&R Ultra-Varmint-Rifle .223 Rem with red dot sight

=== Muzzle loading firearms ===
H&R produced muzzle loading firearms under the Huntsman and Sidekick models, during two different periods. The first period of muzzleloaders used a push in style breech plug and was available in 12-gauge, .58 caliber, and .45 caliber. After reports of hang fires causing injuries and mishaps this model was discontinued in the late 1970s.

The Huntsman name returned on a newly redesigned muzzle loading rifle in the mid-nineties, there were two models produced in this period, marketed under both the H&R and New England Firearms brands as the Huntsman and the Sidekick. Both were based on the new threaded breech plug design; the Huntsman had the same lug pattern as the Pardner Shotgun and Handirifle lines produced at the time allowing for the Huntsman Barrel to be fitted to those actions while the sidekick had a shorter lug to pivot pin distance. The difference in the barrel lug position made the Huntsman applicable to standard firearms laws requiring a background check as centerfire and shotgun barrels could be exchanged on the same receiver, while the Sidekick was considered a muzzle loading firearm and did not require a background check for purchase. The Huntsman and Sidekick models were available in blued and stainless finish, fiber optic sights, and 24" or 26"(magnum) 1 in 28" twist barrels.

The Huntsman barrel was available through the barrel accessory program on rifle or shotgun frames

==== Ramrod ====
The Huntsman and Sidekick muzzle loaders used a telescoping threaded ramrod that was designed to be able to be placed forward of the forearm lug and still match barrel length. The rod would be used to place the projectile the majority of the way down the barrel with the rod collapsed, then the rod would be extended in order to fully seat the projectile on the charge.

==== Breech plug design ====
The new breech plug design utilized an orange Zytel plastic primer carrier that aligned the primer over the breech plug, could be removed easily with gloved or cold hands, and served as a flag indicator that the firearm was primed. There were two different threaded breech plugs that were designed for the Huntsman and Sidekick lines, one 5/8 and the other 7/8 that utilized a proprietary tool to fit in a slotted head. The 7/8 was introduced first and was redesigned with the later production utilizing the 5/8 design.

Numerous aftermarket breech plugs were designed and marketed for the Huntsman and Sidekick line offering the ability to use a bare primer, percussion caps, musket caps, and primed pistol cartridges like the later introduced Remington 700 ML.

- H&R Huntsman: (first design, produced in the 1970s) Push in Breech plug design, available in 12 Gauge, .58 caliber, .45 caliber.
- H&R / New England Firearms Huntsman: (second design, produced in the 1990s) Threaded breech plug design, available in .50 caliber.
- H&R / New England Firearms Sidekick: (second design, produced in the 1990s) Threaded breech plug design, available in .50 caliber. Modified version of second design Huntsman with shorter pivot pin to lug distance.

==== Barrel accessory program ====
H&R1871 offered a barrel accessory program that allowed owners to send in and have additional barrels fitted to their existing frames. The program offered rifle, shotgun, and muzzle loading barrels to be fitted to receivers produced after 1987. The barrel accessory program was discontinued in 2014.

=== Military ===
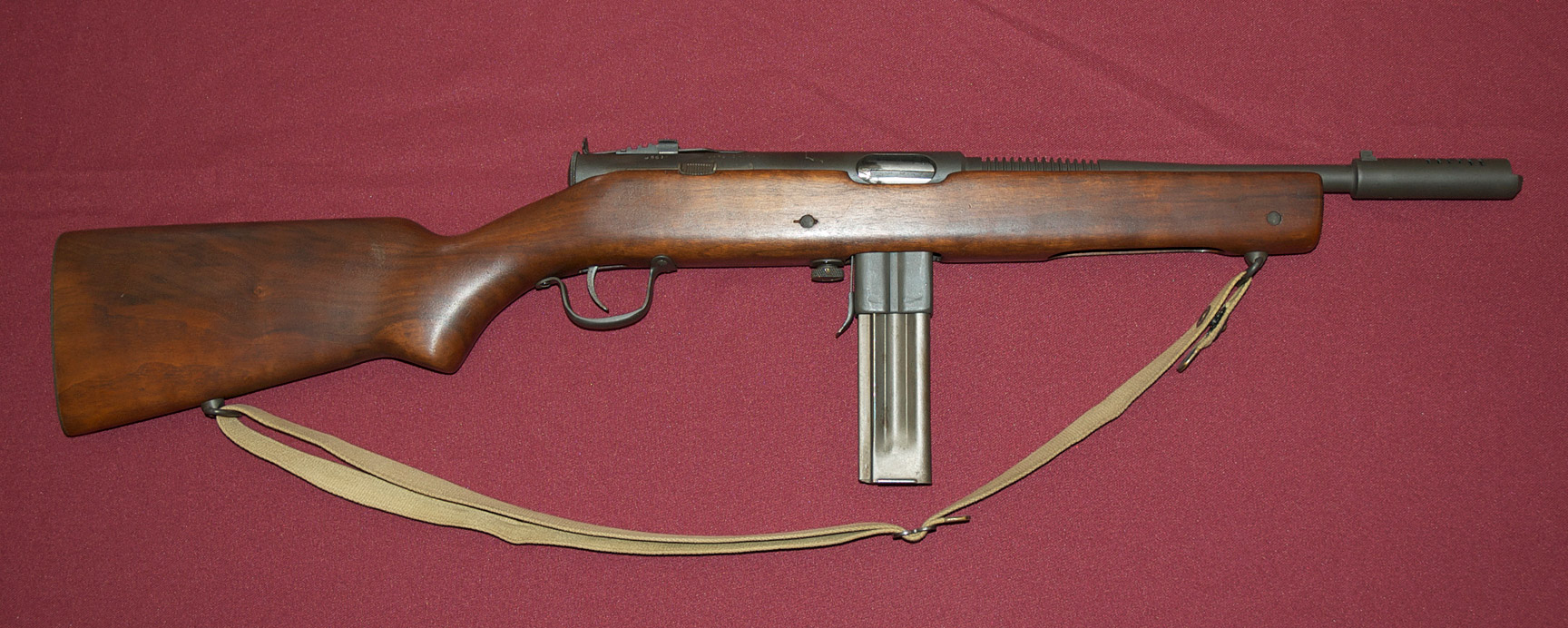
Reising Submachine Gun

- Reising Submachine Gun: Produced during WWII.
- M1 Garand: Harrington & Richardson was assigned serial number ranges 4660001 through 4800000, 5488247 through 5793847, and 400 rifles numbered from 6034330 through 6034729. The major components, such as the barrel, bolt, hammer, operating rod, safety, and trigger housing were stamped with a numeric drawing number and the manufacturer's initials. Harrington & Richardson rifles are marked HRA on all marked parts except the receivers, which were stamped H&R ARMS CO.
- T48 FAL: A licensed copy of the FN FAL; 500 pre-production rifles were produced for trials against the T44 (M14) Rifle.
- M14: H&R had the largest contract (1959–1964) of four manufacturers (H&R, Winchester, The Springfield Armory, and Thompson-Ramo-Wooldridge (TRW)) to produce the M14 rifle.
- M16A1: Working under another U.S. military contract during the Vietnam War, H&R is one of only four companies (Colt, Fabrique National, General Motors Hydramatic Division, and H&R), to have made M16 variants for the U.S. military.
- T223 Rifle: Licensed copy of the Heckler & Koch HK33 assault rifle.

== See also ==
- Frank Wesson Rifles

== General and cited references ==
- Crane, Ellery Bicknell (1907). Historic Homes and Institutions and Genealogical and Personal Memoirs of Worcester County, Massachusetts: With a History of Worcester Society of Antiquity. Lewis Pub. p. 1834.
- Larson, Eric Martin (1993). Variations of the Smooth Bore H&R Handy-Gun: A Pocket Guide to Their Identification. Takoma Park, Maryland: The Author. pp. 65. ISBN No. 0-9636465-0-8.
- Rice, Franklin P., ed. (1899). Worcester of Eighteen Hundred and Ninety-eight: Fifty Years a City: A Graphic Representation of Its Institutions, Industries, and Leaders. Worcester, Mass.: F.S. Blanchard. pp. 809.
