= Caldwell H. Colt (pilot boat) =

Boston Pilot boat

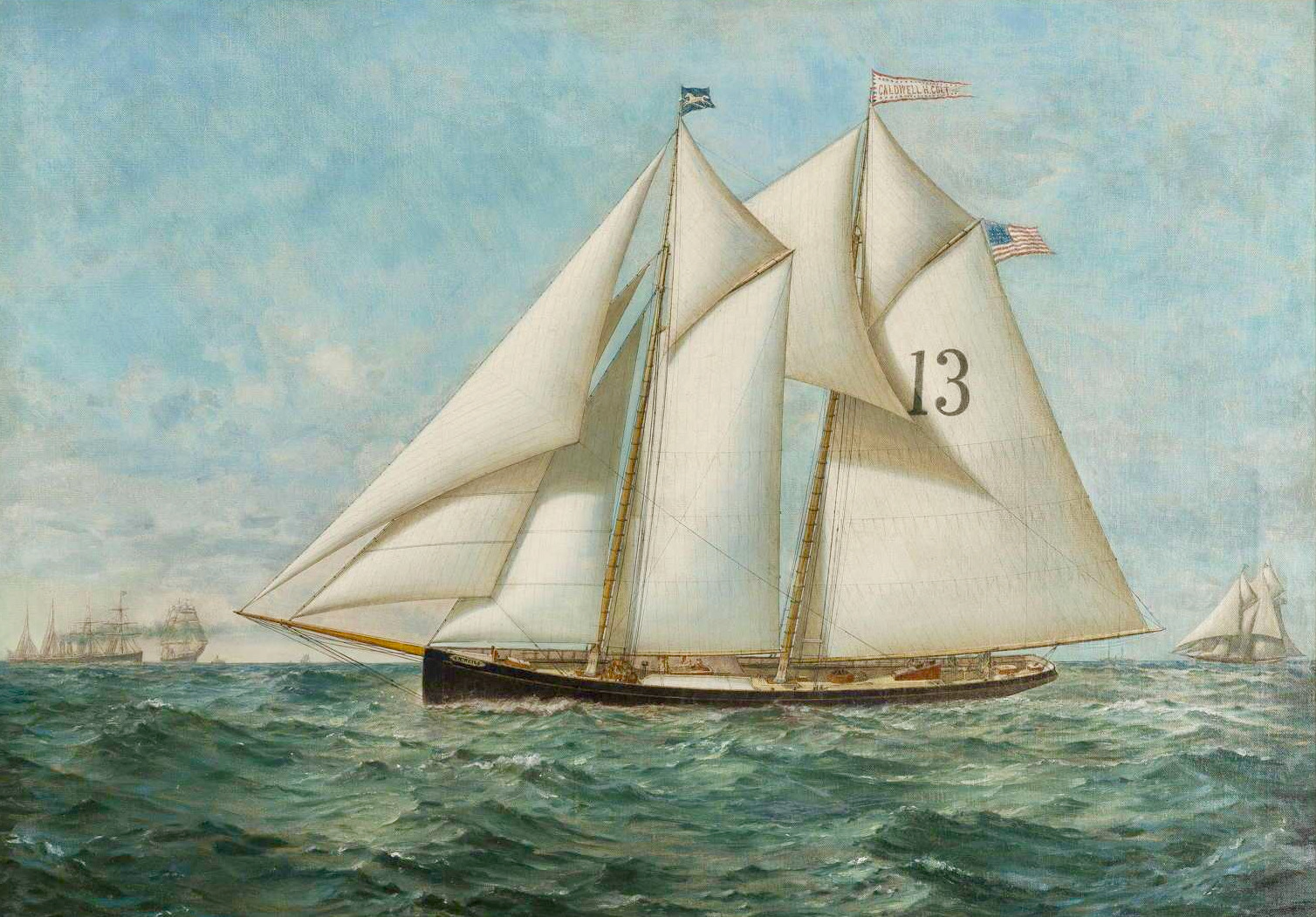
- New York pilot boat Caldwell H. Colt, No. 13, painting by Conrad Freitag.

History

United States
- Name: Caldwell H. Colt
- Namesake: Caldwell Hart Colt, inventor and yachtsman
- Owner: New York Pilots
- Operator: Thomas Dougherty
- Builder: Samuel H. Pine's shipyard
- Cost: $14,000
- Launched: September 13, 1887
- Christened: September 13, 1887 by Elizabeth Colt Beach
- Out of service: June 30, 1903
- Fate: Sold on June 30, 1903

General characteristics
- Class & type: schooner
- Tonnage: TM
- Length: 75 ft 0 in (22.86 m)
- Beam: 21 ft 6 in (6.55 m)
- Depth: 8 ft 10 in (2.69 m)
- Propulsion: Sail

The Caldwell H. Colt was a 19th-century Sandy Hook pilot boat, built in 1887, at the Samuel H. Pine's shipyard in Greenpoint, Brooklyn, for a group of New York Pilots. She was one of the pilot-boats that was in the Great Blizzard of 1888, that was one of the most severe blizzards in American history. In 1903, she was sold to a group of Pensacola, Florida pilots.

== Construction and service ==
New York pilot boat Caldwell H. Colt, was built in 1887 at the Samuel H. Pine shipyard, on Kent Street in Greenpoint, Brooklyn. She had 13 letters in her name, was launched on the 13th, and had 13 members of The Thirteen Club on board during her launch. She had 13 berths in her hold and a crew of 13 men. Elizabeth Colt Beach, age 13, christened the boat. She was 75 feet in length, 21 feet 6 inches beam, and depth of hold 8 feet 10 inches. Her cabin was finished in maple and satin wood. The boat number "13" was painted as a large number on her mainsail, that identified the boat as belonging to the Sandy Hook Pilots. Captain Thomas Dougherty was one of her pilots. She was named in honor of Caldwell Hart Colt, an inventor, yachtsman, and owner of the schooner Dauntless.

On March 12, 1888, in the Great Blizzard of 1888, the pilot-boat Caldwell H. Colt, No. 13 along with other pilot-bats, was caught up in one of the most severe blizzards in American history. Newspaper reporter William O. Inglis of The New York World, was on the Colt during the storm near Long Island, to write a story about the life of on a pilot-boat in the winter. Inglis describes his experience when great waves poured icy water into the cabin, burned out the stove, and left her with water filled bunks. When the winds subsided, senior pilot James Fairgreaves was able to pump the water from her cabin and sail her into port.

== End of service ==
On June 30, 1903, the pilot-boat Caldwell H. Colt was sold to Captain Frank Dunn, of the Pensacola pilots for $6,000. He sailed the Colt out from New York to Florida.

== See also ==
- List of Northeastern U. S. Pilot Boats
