= USS Arcady =

Patrol vessel of the United States Navy

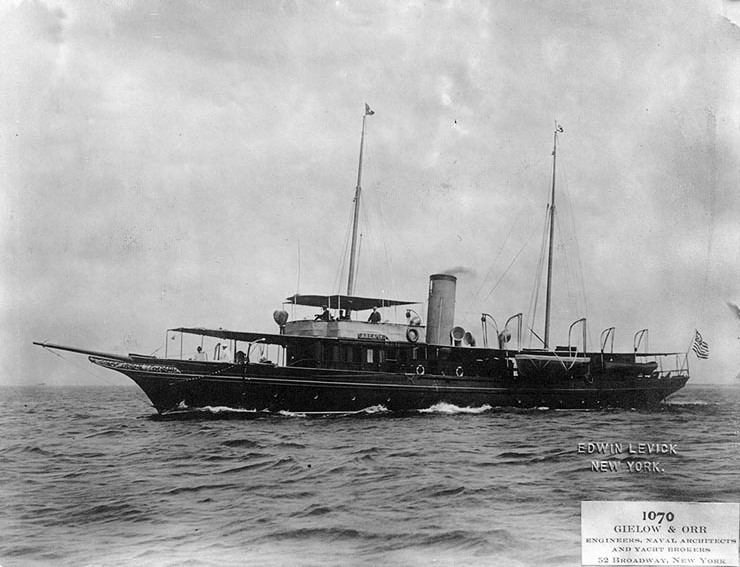
- Arcady as a private yacht sometime between 1898 and 1917.

History

United States
- Name: USS Arcady
- Namesake: Previous name retained
- Builder: Samuel H. Pine, New York, New York
- Completed: 1898
- Acquired: 28 May 1917
- Commissioned: 8 June 1917
- Decommissioned: 12 May 1919
- Stricken: 17 May 1919
- Fate: Sold 20 September 1919
- Notes: Operated as private yacht Osceola and Arcady 1898–1917

General characteristics
- Type: Patrol vessel
- Tonnage: 167 gross register tons
- Length: 140 ft (43 m)
- Beam: 18 ft 6 in (5.64 m)
- Draft: 8 ft 6 in (2.59 m) forward
- Propulsion: Steam engine
- Speed: 13 knots
- Complement: 23
- Armament: 1 × 3-pounder gun; 2 × machine guns

USS Arcady (SP-577) was a United States Navy patrol vessel in commission from 1917 to 1919.

Arcady was built as the private steam yacht Osceola by Samuel H. Pine at New York City. She later was renamed Arcady.

On 28 May 1917, the U.S. Navy purchased Arcady from her owner, Arthur Meeker of Beverly, Massachusetts, for use as a section patrol vessel during World War I. She was commissioned at Boston, Massachusetts, as USS Arcady (SP-577) on 8 June 1917.

Initially assigned to the 1st Naval District in northern New England, Arcady acted as duty and guard boat at the Boston Navy Yard in Boston. She also conducted patrols off Provincetown, Massachusetts, and near the Cape Cod Canal.

In October 1918, Arcady was reassigned to the 2nd Naval District in southern New England, where she performed patrol duty from her base at Submarine Base New London at New London, Connecticut, through the end of World War I and into the spring of 1919.

In April 1919, Arcady moved to New York City, where she was decommissioned at the Marine Basin on 12 May 1919. She was stricken from the Navy List on 17 May 1919 sold to Mr. C. R. Stewart of Arlington, New Jersey, on 20 September 1919.
