= Joseph Florimond Loubat =

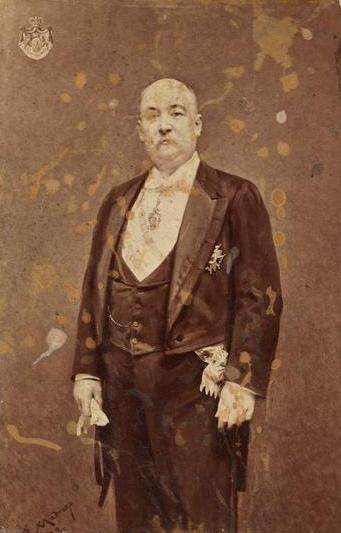
- Joseph Loubat, ca 1893
- Born: January 21, 1831; New York City
- Died: March 1, 1927 (aged 96)
- Education: University of Paris
- Occupation: philanthropist
- Title: Duc de Loubat

Joseph Florimond, Duke of Loubat (January 21, 1831 – March 1, 1927) was a French and American bibliophile, antiquarian, sportsman, and philanthropist. His ducal title was conferred upon him by Pope Leo XIII in April 1893.

== Biography ==
Loubat was born in New York City to Alphonse Loubat and Susan Gaillard Loubat. His father was a French inventor and businessman who was engaged in transport infrastructure development in New York City and Paris. Joseph Loubat studied at Heidelberg University and joined the Corps Saxo-Borussia. He was graduated from the University of Paris in 1847, and received a doctorate in law from the University of Jena in 1869.

In 1866, he accompanied the United States' Assistant Secretary of the Navy Gustavus Fox on a diplomatic mission to Russia as one of his secretaries.

Loubat became involved with the organization of the 1867 World Exposition.

After traveling extensively in Europe, and dividing the time of his life between the Old and New Worlds, he finally settled in Paris where he died in 1927. He rests at Passy Cemetery.

== Philanthropy ==
Loubat was a philanthropist who gave in 1898 Columbia University a gift of $1.1 million in property, and later gave Columbia money to fund the Loubat Prize. He also endowed chairs at several universities across Europe and the United States, including Columbia. He donated a statue of Pope Leo XIII to the Catholic University of America in 1891.

Loubat contributed monetary funds towards the founding of the Musée d'Ethnographie du Trocadéro and Musée de l'Homme in Paris. Loubat also donated to the American Museum of Natural History a large collection of Mexican archaeological artifacts assembled on his behalf by Edward Seler in the State of Oaxaca, Mexico; a series of casts of the original Cotzumalhuapa sculptures from the ruins of Santa Lucía Cotzumalguapa, Guatemala, kept in the Ethnological Museum of Berlin; a photographic copy of the "Codex Legislatif," an ancient Aztec codex, preserved in the Library of the Chamber of Deputies, Paris; and a facsimile of the "Codex Vaticanus, No. 3773," an ancient Aztec book preserved in the Vatican Library, Rome.

== Yachting ==
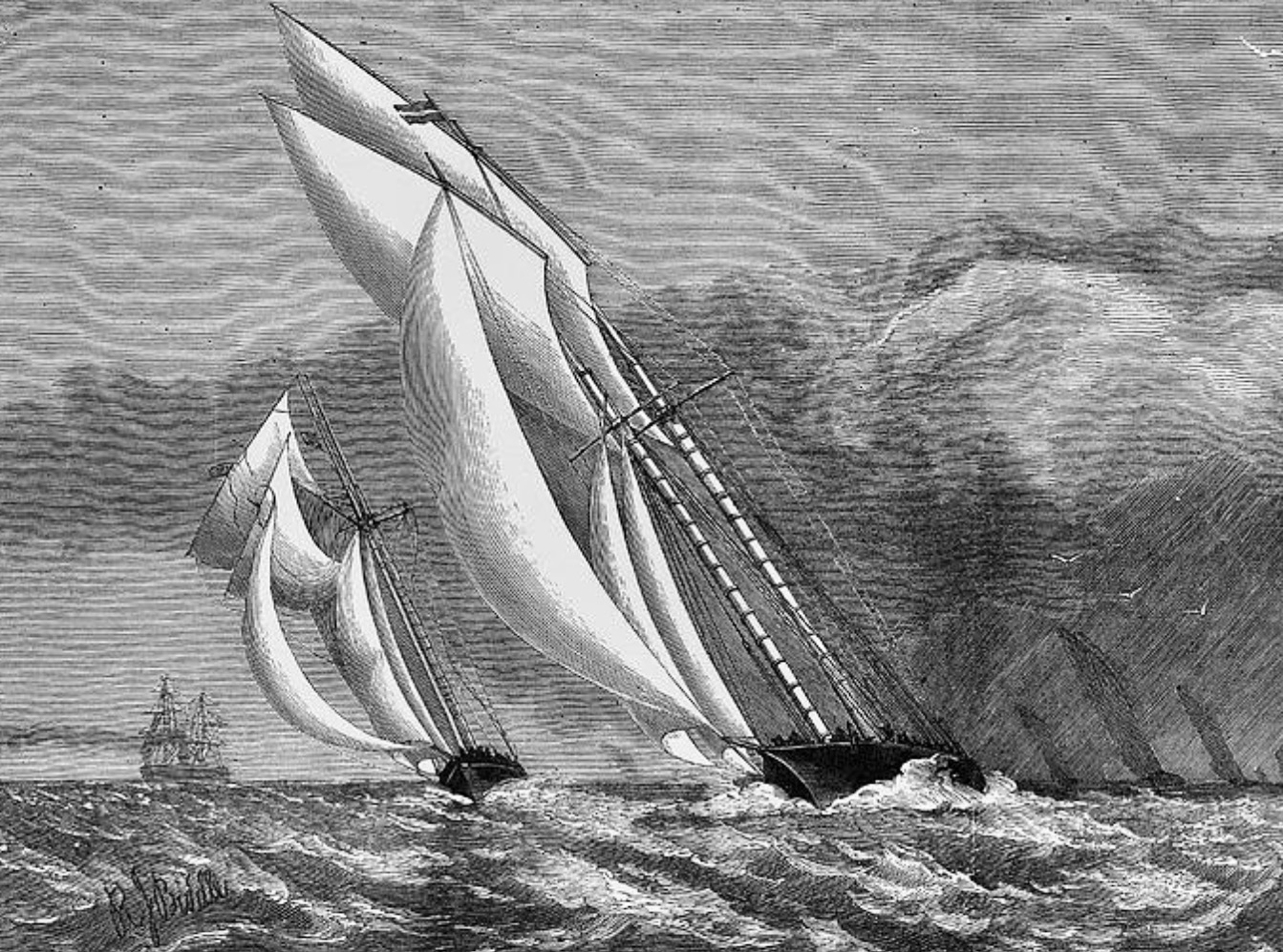
Yacht Enchantress at the international races in 1874.

Being an avid yachtsman, he was instrumental in the development of yachting in Europe and the United States. In 1873, Loubat's racing schooner, Enchantress, unsuccessfully competed against the Dreadnaught in the Cape May Challenge Cup; in 1874, the Enchantress won in a yacht race from Le Havre to Southampton and brought home the Cape May Cup. On October 27, 1873, Loubat received a letter of thanks from President H. Harbinson, for Loubat's generous donation of $1,000 to the New York and Sandy Hook Pilots' Charitable Fund.

Loubat sailed in American, European and Russian waters, writing one of the earliest American yachting memoir, A Yachtsman’s Scrap Book, or the Ups and Downs of Yacht Racing. He dedicated the book in memory of the designer and sailing master Robert Fish.

== Honors ==
In addition to his ennoblement as Duc de Loubat, Loubat was a member of the Institut de France and Academie des Inscriptions et Belles Lettres, a Commandeur of the Légion d'honneur, and a member of the Union Club, Knickerbocker Club, and New York Yacht Club. Also, he was a member of the New York and Massachusetts Historical Societies, the American Geographical Society, the American Numismatic Society, and the Hispanic Society of America, among others. He was elected a member of the American Antiquarian Society in 1897.

The pilot-boat, Joseph F. Loubat was named after him.

== Works ==
- Loubat, J. F. Address of the Duke of Loubat. New York: The Knickerbocker press, 1902.
- Loubat, J. F. Clave general de jeroglíficos americanos de don Ignacio Borunda: manuscrit inédit pub. le duc de Loubat. Rome: J. P. Scotti, 1898.
- Loubat, J. F. Codex Fejérváry-Mayer: An Old Mexican Picture Manuscript in the Liverpool Free Public Museums. Published at the Expense of His Excellency the Duke of Loubat. Berlin: Printed by T. and A. Constable, 1901.
- Loubat, J. F. Estudios españoles. Los trabajos geográficos de la Casa de contratación. Sevilla: Escuela tipográfica y Librería Salesianas, 1900.
- Loubat, J. F. The Medalllic History of the United States of America, 1776-1876, with 170 Etchings by Jules Jacquemart. Vols. 1-2. New-York, 1878.
- Loubat, J. F. Narrative of the Mission to Russia in 1866, of the Hon. Gustavus Vasa Fox, Assistant-Secretary of the Navy. From the Journals and Notes of Joseph Florimond Loubat. Edited by John D. Champlin, Jr. New York: D. Appleton and Company, 1873.
- Loubat, J. F. A Yachtsman's Scrap Book: Or, the Ups and Downs of Yacht Racing. New York: Brentano Bros, 1887.
- Loubat, J. F. Descripción Del Códice Cospiano: Manuscrito Pictórico De Los Antiguos Náuas Que Se Conserva En La Biblioteca De La Universidad De Bolonia. Roma: Establecimiento Danesi, 1898.
- Loubat, J. F. Libro Del Messico, Donato Dal Sig. Co: Valerio Zani Al Sig. March: Cospi Il Di Xxvi Dicre. Mdclxv: [manuscrito Pictórico De Los Antíguos Náuas Que Se Conserva En La Biblioteca De La Universidad De Bolonia. Roma: Establecimiento Danesi, 1898.
- Loubat, J. F. Il Manoscritto Messicano Vaticano 3738: Detto Il Codice Rios. Roma: Establecimiento Danesi, 1900.
