= Caldwell Hart Colt =

American inventor and yachtsman

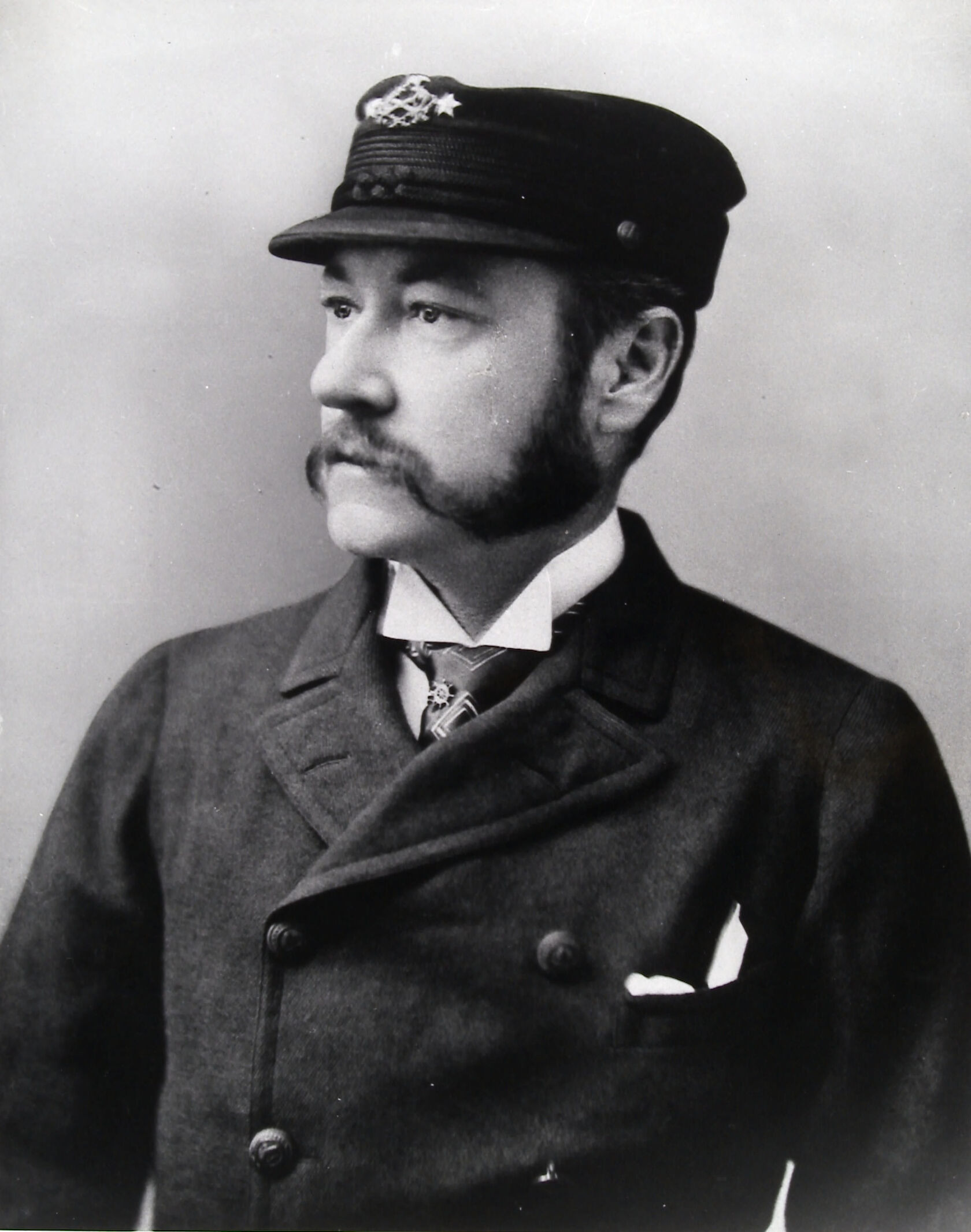
- Born: November 24, 1858; Hartford, Connecticut, U.S.
- Died: January 21, 1894 (aged 35); Punta Gorda, Florida, U.S.
- Education: Yale University
- Occupations: Inventor, yachtsman
- Parents: Samuel Colt (father); Elizabeth Jarvis Colt (mother)

Caldwell Hart Colt (November 24, 1858 – January 21, 1894) was an American inventor and yachtsman.

== Biography ==
Caldwell Hart Colt was born in Hartford, Connecticut, the son of Samuel Colt, founder of Colt's Patent Fire-Arms Manufacturing Company (now known as Colt's Manufacturing Company) and Elizabeth Jarvis Colt. Caldwell Colt attended Yale University and was known later in life for being a yachtsman.

He served as vice-commodore of the New York Yacht Club in 1888 and commodore of the Larchmont Yacht Club from 1892–1893. He was the owner of the schooner yacht Dauntless and sloop Wizard. The New York pilot-boat Caldwell H. Colt was named in honor of Colt.

Following in his father's footsteps as a gunmaker, in 1879 he designed the Colt double barrel rifle. This rifle was chambered in .45-70 Government and is one of the rarest Colt firearms that was ever made.

== Death ==
Colt died of heart failure in Punta Gorda, Florida on January 21, 1894. His mother had a parish house built near Armsmear in his name opposite the Church of the Good Shepherd. The building was designed by Edward Tuckerman Potter who designed the earlier church on the site. The Church of the Good Shepherd and Parish House is listed in the National Register of Historic Places. She also renamed St. James Episcopal Church to Church of the Good Shepherd and bought a Tiffany stained glass window that is still there today in memory of her son.
