= Richard Jarvis (businessman) =

American industrialist

President of Colt's Manufacturing Company
- In office 1865–1901
- Preceded by: Elisha K. Root
- Succeeded by: John Hall

Personal details
- Born: Richard William Hart Jarvis; November 30, 1829 Portland, Connecticut, United States
- Died: January 21, 1903 (aged 73) Hartford, Connecticut, United States
- Relatives: Samuel Colt, Elizabeth Jarvis Colt
- Occupation: Businessman and industrialist

Richard William Hart Jarvis (November 30, 1829 – January 21, 1903) was an American businessman and industrialist from Connecticut.

Jarvis was the brother-in-law of Samuel Colt who took control of Colt's Manufacturing Company on the death of Elisha K. Root, serving as the company's longest president from 1865 to 1901. Jarvis served the company from the end of the American Civil War through the early 20th century seeing the transition from percussion revolvers to cartridge revolvers to semi-automatic pistols and machine guns.

He died on January 21, 1903, in Hartford, Connecticut.
