= Enchantress (yacht) =

19th-century racing yacht

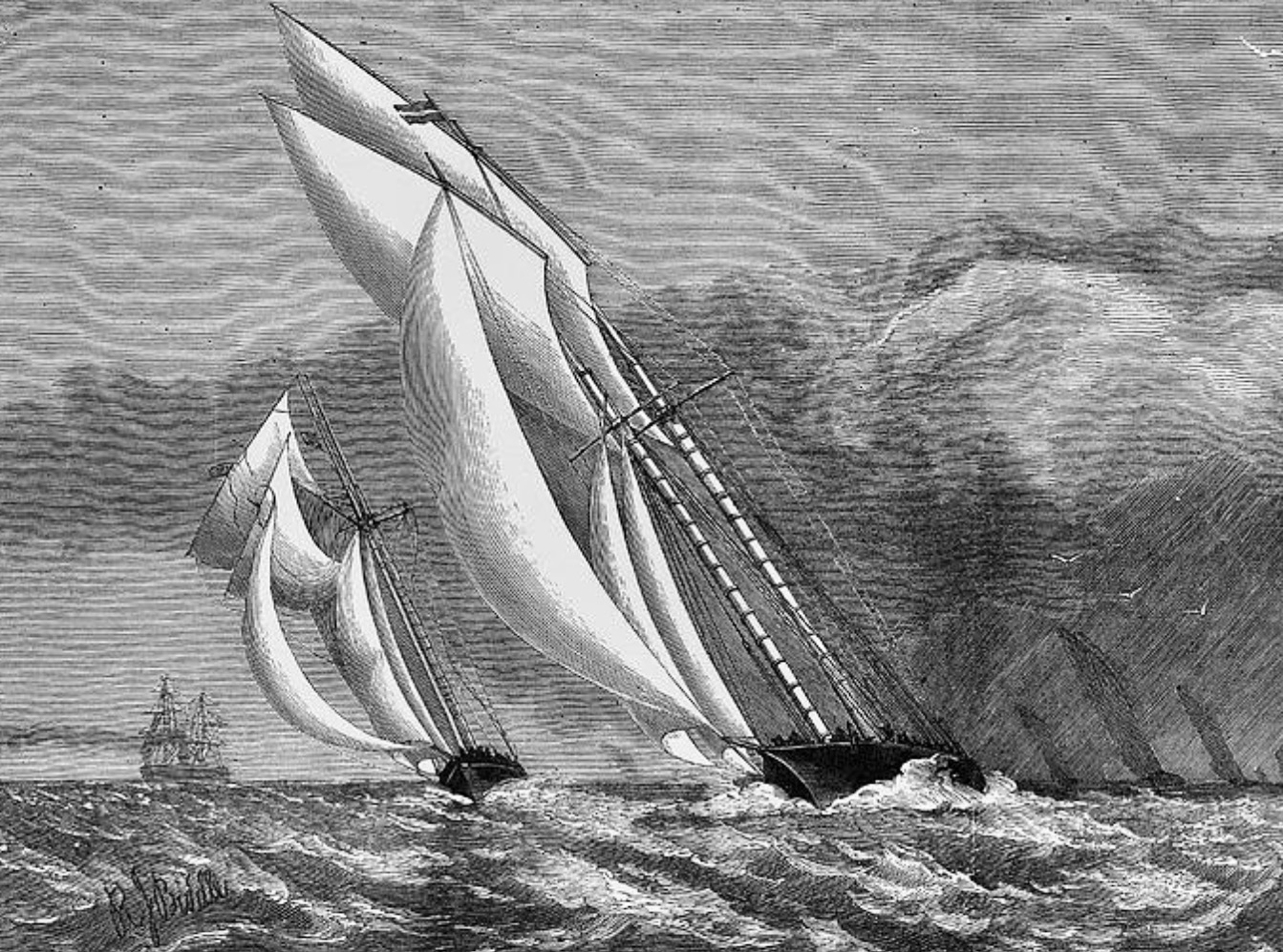
- The yacht Enchantress
- Class & type: Gaff rig schooner
- Tonnage: 300 Thames Measurement
- Length: LOA 136 ft 0 in (41.45 m); LWL 115 ft 10 in (35.31 m)
- Beam: 24 ft 11 in (7.59 m)
- Draft: 13 ft 6 in (4.11 m)
- Depth: 11 ft 0 in (3.35 m)
- Propulsion: Sail
- Sail plan: 5,296 sq ft (492.0 m^{2}) upwind sail area
- Notes: Hull material: Wood (white oak, locust, cedar and chestnut)

History

United States
- Owner: Joseph F. Loubat
- Builder: Samuel H. Pine of Greenpoint, Brooklyn
- Launched: May, 1871
- Christened: Enchantress

The Enchantress was a 19th-century racing yacht, winner of several national and international Cups including the Royal Yacht Squadron's 53-mile (85 km) regatta around the Le Havre to Southampton, and the New York Yacht Club's 140-mile (230 km) regatta from Owl's Head Point to Sandy Hook Lightship. She was designed by Robert Fish for George L. Lorillard.

== Enchantress's origins ==
In 1871, the Enchantress was modeled, in New York, by Captain Robert Fish (1812–1883) for George L. Lorillard. She has had several owners (see subsequent owners below). The Enchantress was built by shipbuilder Samuel H. Pine of Greenpoint, Brooklyn. She was berthed at the New York Yacht Club and sailed by Captain Reuben King. Fish designed hundreds of vessels of all sizes, including the Truant, Challenge, Eva, and the Meteor. Her model resides at the New York Yacht Club.

== Captain ==
The Enchantress was captained by Reuben King, the first mate, William Dand, and the Sandy Hook Pilot, Peter W. Roff. There were 18 crew members. Joseph F. Loubat, of the New York Yacht Club, wrote about the Enchantress and Robert Fish in a yachting memoir, A Yachtsman’s Scrap Book, or the Ups and Downs of Yacht Racing.

== Cape May challenge cup ocean race ==
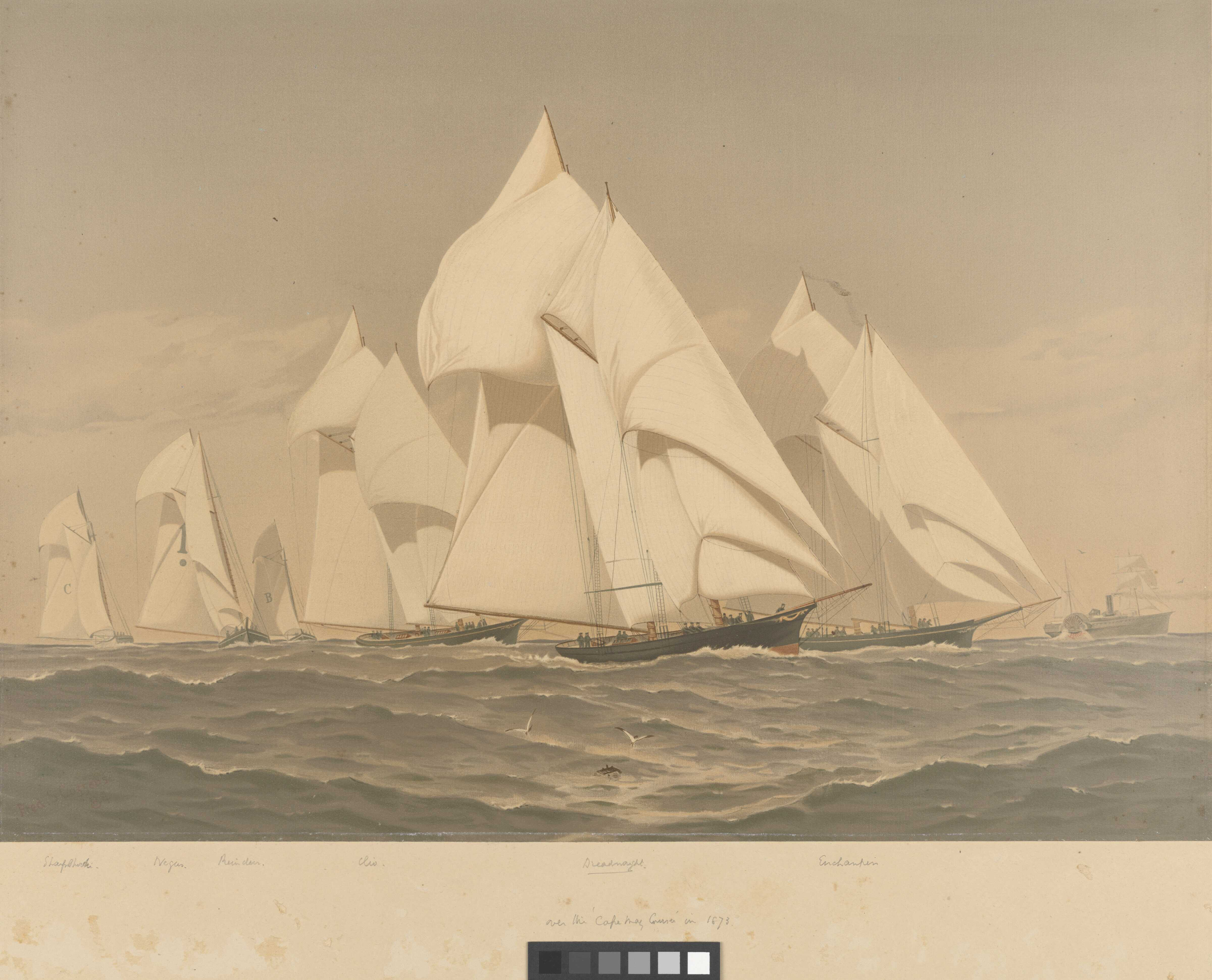
American Yachts: Negus, Reindeer, Clio, Dreadnought and Enchantress over the Cape May Course, 1873.

On October 9, 1873, the Enchantress was one of the boats that participated in the New York Yacht Club ocean 140-mile (230 km) regatta, which was a yacht race from Owl's Head Point around to Cape May Lighthouse in New Jersey, and back to the Sandy hook Lightship. Both yachts and pilot boats were entered in the race. The Enchantress was the winning yacht for the Bennett Cup, valued at $1,000. The pilot-boat Thomas S. Negus won second place and James W. Elwell which came in third place.

The name "Bennett Cup" came from James Gordon Bennett who was the commodore of the New York Yacht Club. At this time, Joseph F. Loubat was the owner, Captain Robert Fish (designer), Reuben King (master), and Sandy Hook Pilot Peter W. Roff were on board the Enchantress in the race.

== International English yacht race ==
Anchored off Stapleton, Staten Island, the Enchantress was overhauled with new rigging, spars and sails to prepare her for the trip across the Atlantic to England. On December 1, 1873, the Enchantress arrived at Cowes, England, from New York. On February 15, 1874, Fish left on the steamer Herman to Cowes where he took command of the Enchantress. On July 25, 1874, the Enchantress won the Royal Yacht Squadron's 53-mile (85 km) regatta around the Le Havre to Southampton and brought home the Cape May Cup. The Enchantress was commanded by Captain Poland.

== Prince of Wales's challenge cup yacht race ==
On August 8, 1874, the Enchantress entered the Prince of Wales 53-mile (85 km) cup race from Cowes around the Shambles Lightship, and back around the Nab, passing the Isle of Wight to Cowes. The race was for American and English schooners and yawls of 100 tons or more. The Enchantress was listed as 320 tons and the owner was Joseph F. Loubat. After a series of mishaps, the Enchantress returned to Cowes.

== Other races ==
- Loubat Ocean Cup Race - October, 1876: from Owl's Head Point back to the Sandy hook Lightship
- Cup May Race - September, 1877: to Cape May Lighthouse and return to Sandy Hook

== Out of service ==
On February 22, 1922, the yacht Enchantress was not commissioned during the financial year 1922-23 and was decommissioned in Portsmouth Harbour.

== Subsequent owners ==
1. In 1871, Loubat sold the Enchantress to George L. Lorillard.
2. In 1873, Loubat bought back the Enchantress from George L. Lorillard.
3. On October 6, 1877, Loubat sold the Enchantress to Major Owen Williams.
4. In 1879, the Enchantress was sold in England.

== See also ==
- List of large sailing yachts
