= Samuel H. Pine =

American shipbuilder (1827–1904)

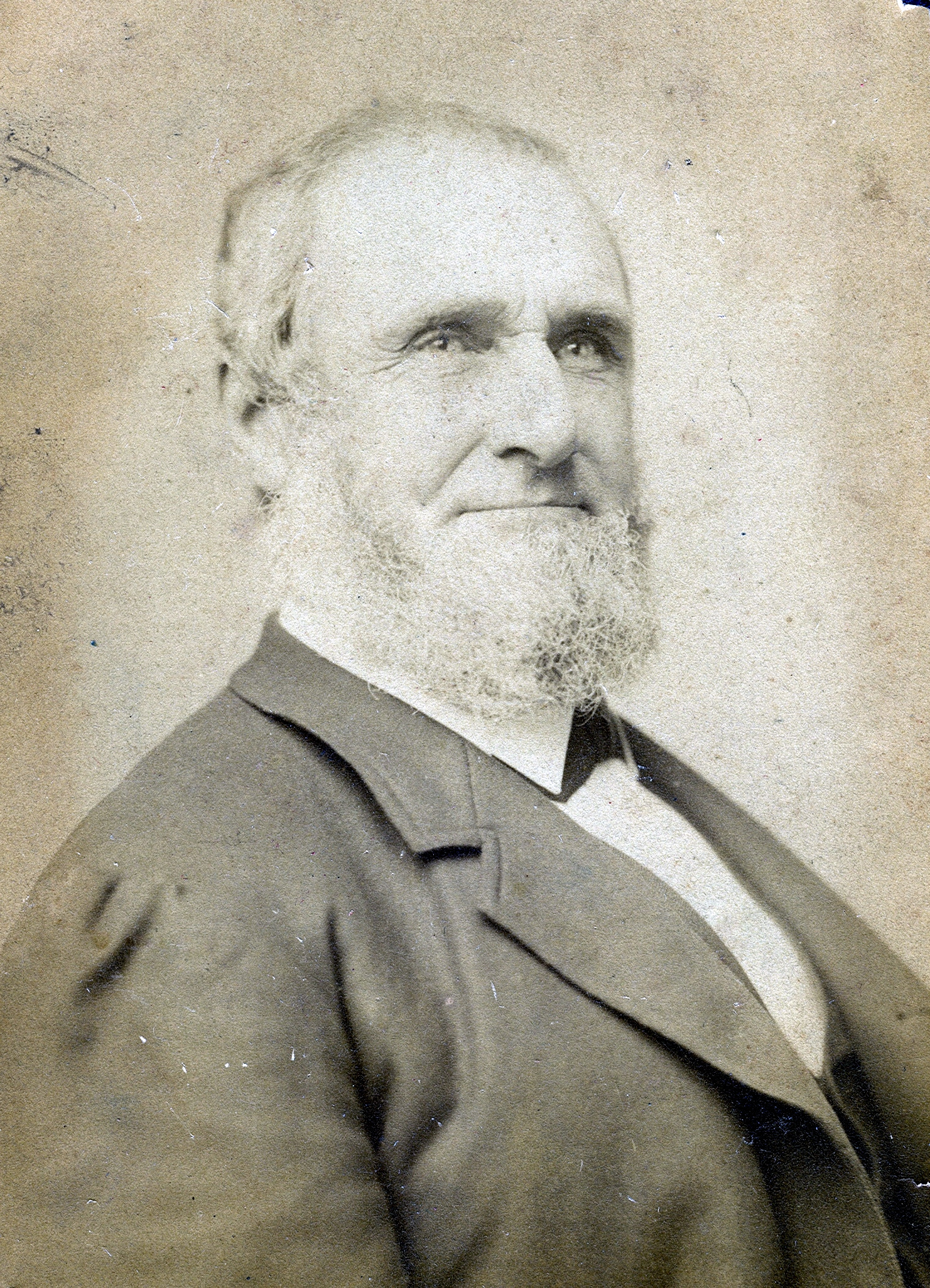
- Samuel H. Pine, Shipbuilder.
- Born: Samuel Havre Pine; November 1, 1827; Cumberland County, New Jersey
- Died: June 3, 1904 (aged 76); Brooklyn, New York
- Occupation: shipbuilder
- Spouse: Alice Pauline Giberson

Samuel Havre Pine (November 1827 – June 3, 1904), was a 19th-century American ship designer and builder located in Greenpoint, Brooklyn. He built the racing yacht Enchantress as well as many sailing schooners and yachts; steam yachts; and steamships.

== Early life ==
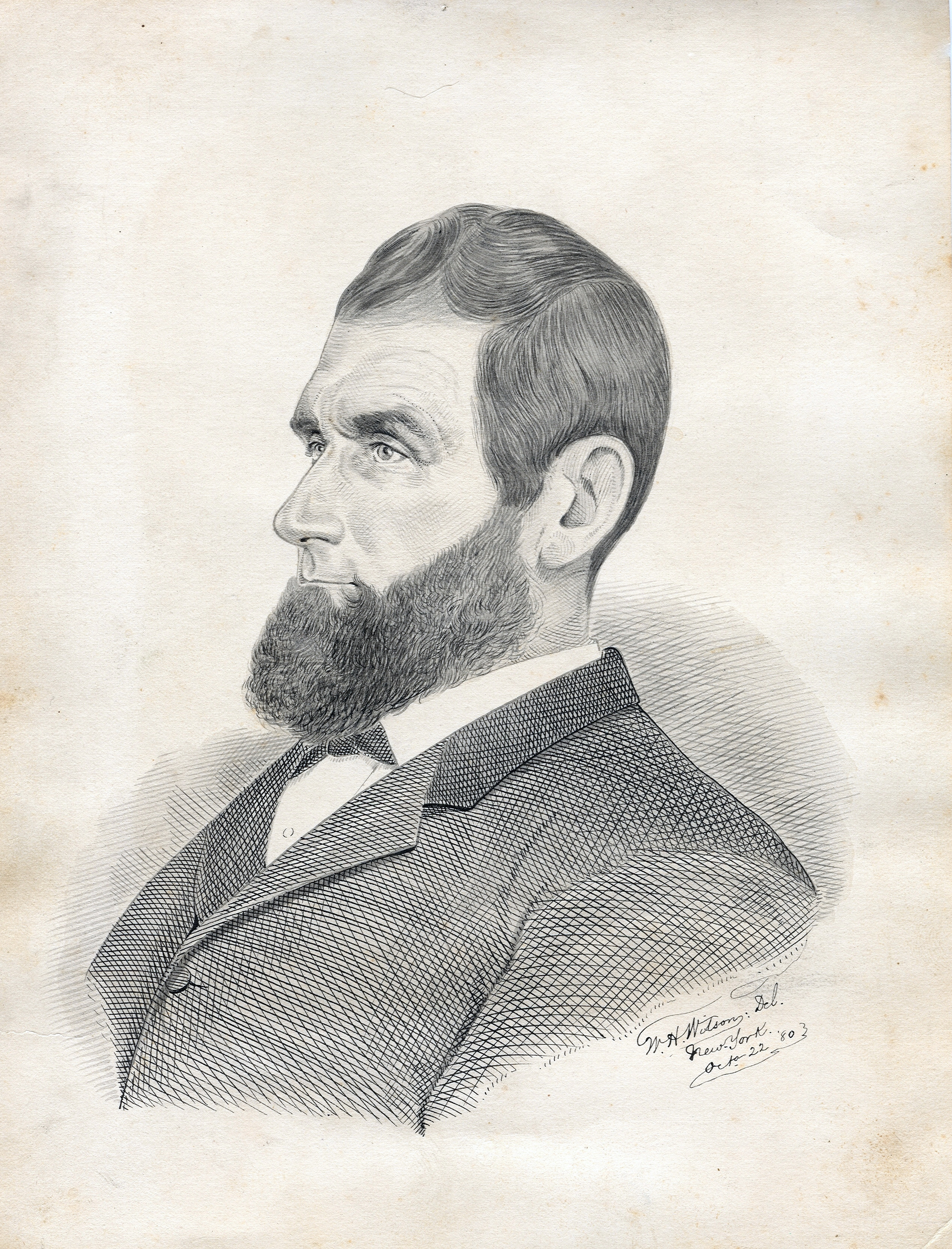
19th Century Engraving of Samuel H. Pine.

Samuel H. Pine was born at Morris River, Cumberland County, New Jersey in November 1827. He was the son of John Pine (1785-1876) and Elizabeth Bare (1789-1857). He married Alice Pauline Giberson on August 3, 1853 in Manhattan, New York. They had several sons, one being Charles Henry Pine (1857-1932) and one daughter who was married to Thomas F. Mathews, Assemblyman in the Thirteenth District.

== Career ==
At age 15, he became interested in shipbuilding and was employed at a Port Republic, New Jersey shipyard. Four years later he worked for William Foulks in Greenpoint, Brooklyn. He then was employed as a foreman for Jacob Aaron Westervelt (later mayor of New York). Under Westervelt, he built the USS Brooklyn (1858). Soon after he worked for Henry Steers and was superintendent for the construction of the notable steamships Arizona (1865), Japan (1867) and Montana (1865) for the Pacific Mail Line, which were built at the foot of Java Street, Greenpoint.

After the American Civil War, Pine built a multitude of ships, including many well-appointed fast steam and sailing yachts for famous magnates of the day, including Jacob and Louis Lorillard. He built the schooner racing yacht Enchantress; famous in its day for international racing and whose model resides at the New York Yacht Club.

In April 1880, Pine built three revenue cutters for the Mexican Government. The dimensions were 65 ft. in length; 12 ft. breadth of beam; 5.5 ft. depth of hold.

When Henry Steers left the shipbuilding business, Henry Piepgras developed the Henry Piepgras shipyard at Pottery Beach, in Greenpoint. Pine had a partnership with Piepgras as both men built ships at the Piepgras & Pine shipyard. On May 1, 1885, the first steel yacht ever constructed in Boston was built at the Piepgras & Pine shipyard. Pierre Lorillard also built a yacht at the same shipyard. The steam yacht Tillie was lengthened in 1883 by Piepgras & Pine. The steel yacht Wanda was built in 1885 and launched from the yard of Piepgras & Pine. The copartnership ended on mutual terms on September 1, 1885.

=== List of sailing schooners and yachts ===
As a shipbuilder Pine built the following sailing schooners and yachts:

- Enchantress (1871) schooner yacht for George L. Lorillard; the designer was Robert Fish
- The Wanderer (1871) yacht for Louis Lorillard
- Sandy Hook pilot boat W. W. Story (1874)
- Sea Witch - Sailing Yacht
- Sandy Hook pilot boat Edward Cooper (1879)
- Sandy Hook pilot boat Caldwell H. Colt (1887)
- Thomas L. Watt's steam yacht Osceola (1898)

=== List of steam yachts ===
Pine built the following steam yachts:

- Trophy for Jacob Lorillard
- Veto for Jacob Lorillard
- EMU (1880)
- Tillie (1882) steam yacht
- Sophia (1882)
- Venture (1883)
- Wanda (1885)
- Reva (1886)
- Arcady
- Idler for James McMillan
- Daring (1886)
- Reverie (1890)
- Wompanoag (1887)
- Steam Yacht Rival
- Mary Patten (1893) for the Long Branch Steamboat Company's Pleaseure Bay Line.

== Death ==
Pine died on June 3, 1904, in Brooklyn following an operation at the age of 77. He is buried in the family plot in Brooklyn's Green-Wood Cemetery.
