= Elizabeth Jarvis Colt =

Widow and heir of firearms manufacturer Samuel Colt (1826–1905)

Elizabeth Hart Jarvis Colt
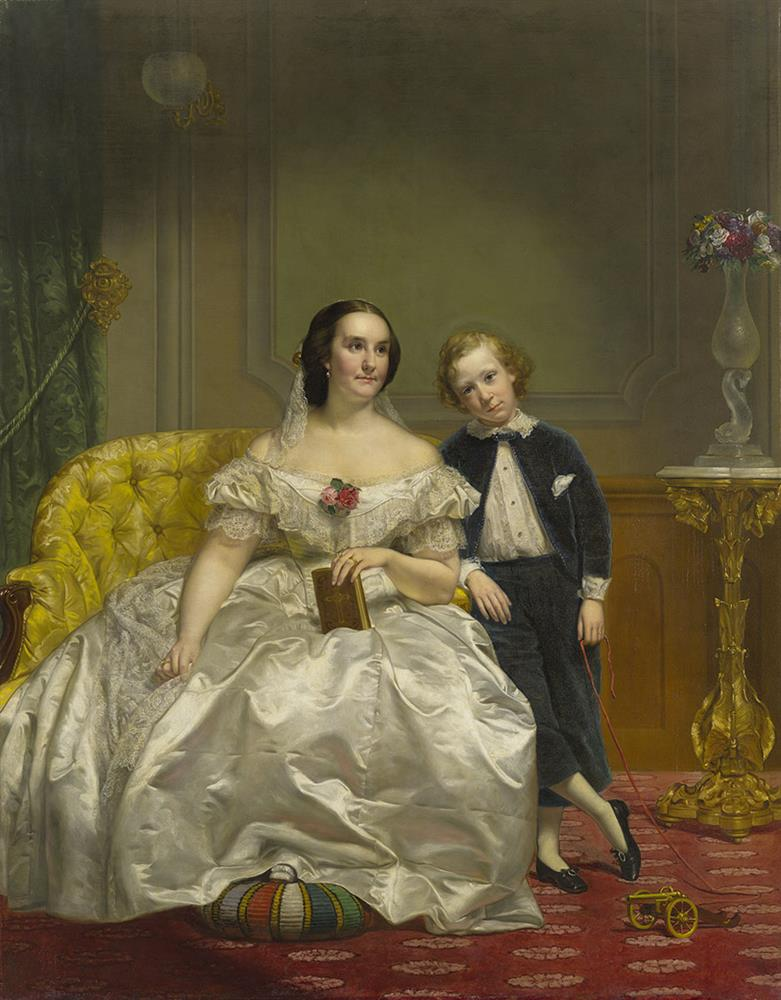
- Elizabeth Hart Jarvis Colt with her son Caldwell, 1865
- Born: Elizabeth Hart Jarvis; October 5, 1826; Saybrook, Connecticut, United States
- Died: August 23, 1905 (aged 78); Newport, Rhode Island, United States
- Occupations: Businesswoman, philanthropist
- Spouse: Samuel Colt
- Children: Caldwell Hart Colt
- Relatives: John C. Colt, Richard Jarvis

Elizabeth Jarvis Colt (born Elizabeth Hart Jarvis; October 5, 1826 – August 23, 1905) was an American philanthropist and the widow and heir of firearms manufacturer Samuel Colt, founder of Colt's Manufacturing Company.

== Early life ==
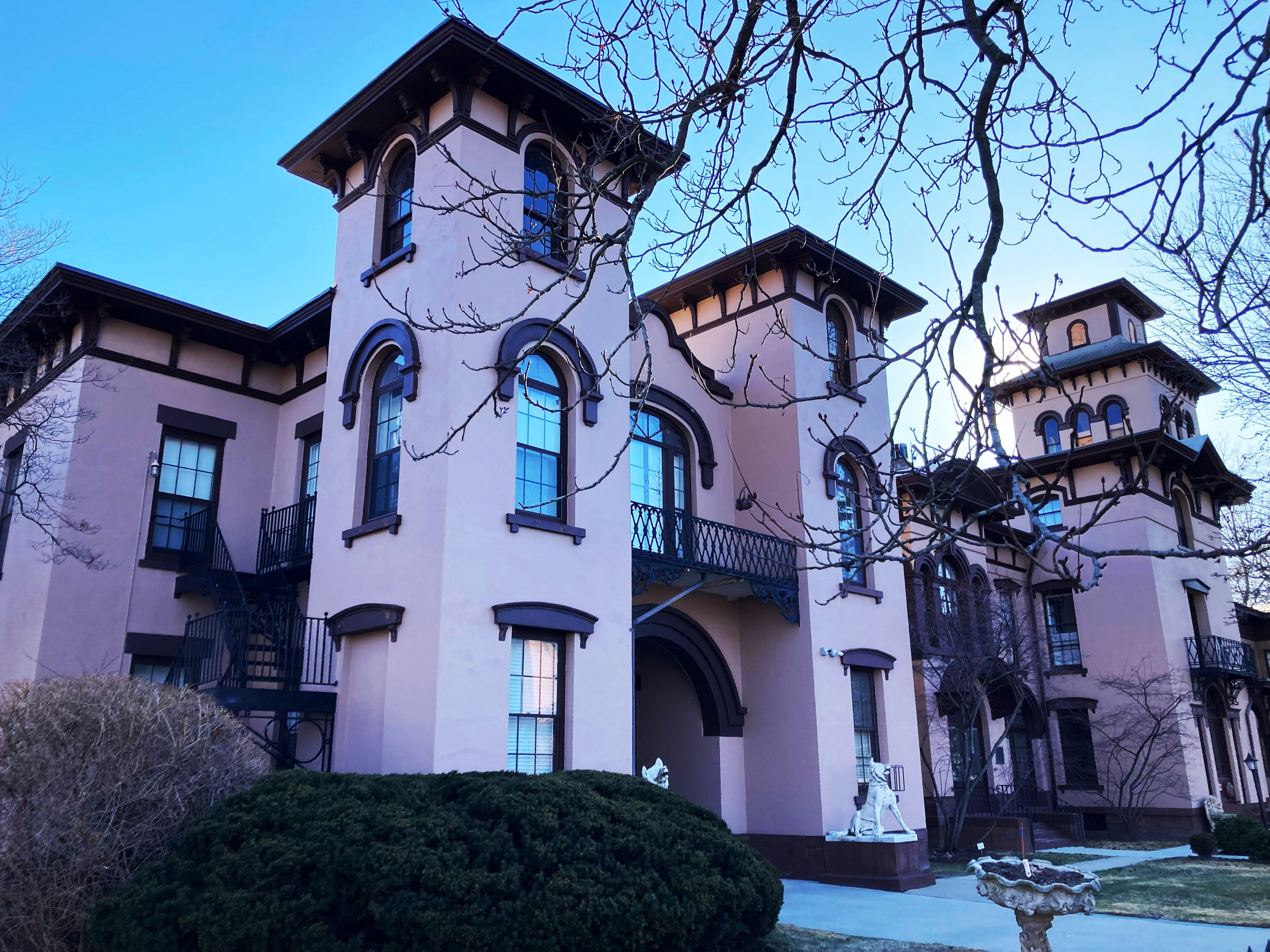
Armsmear, Hartford, CT (January 2025)

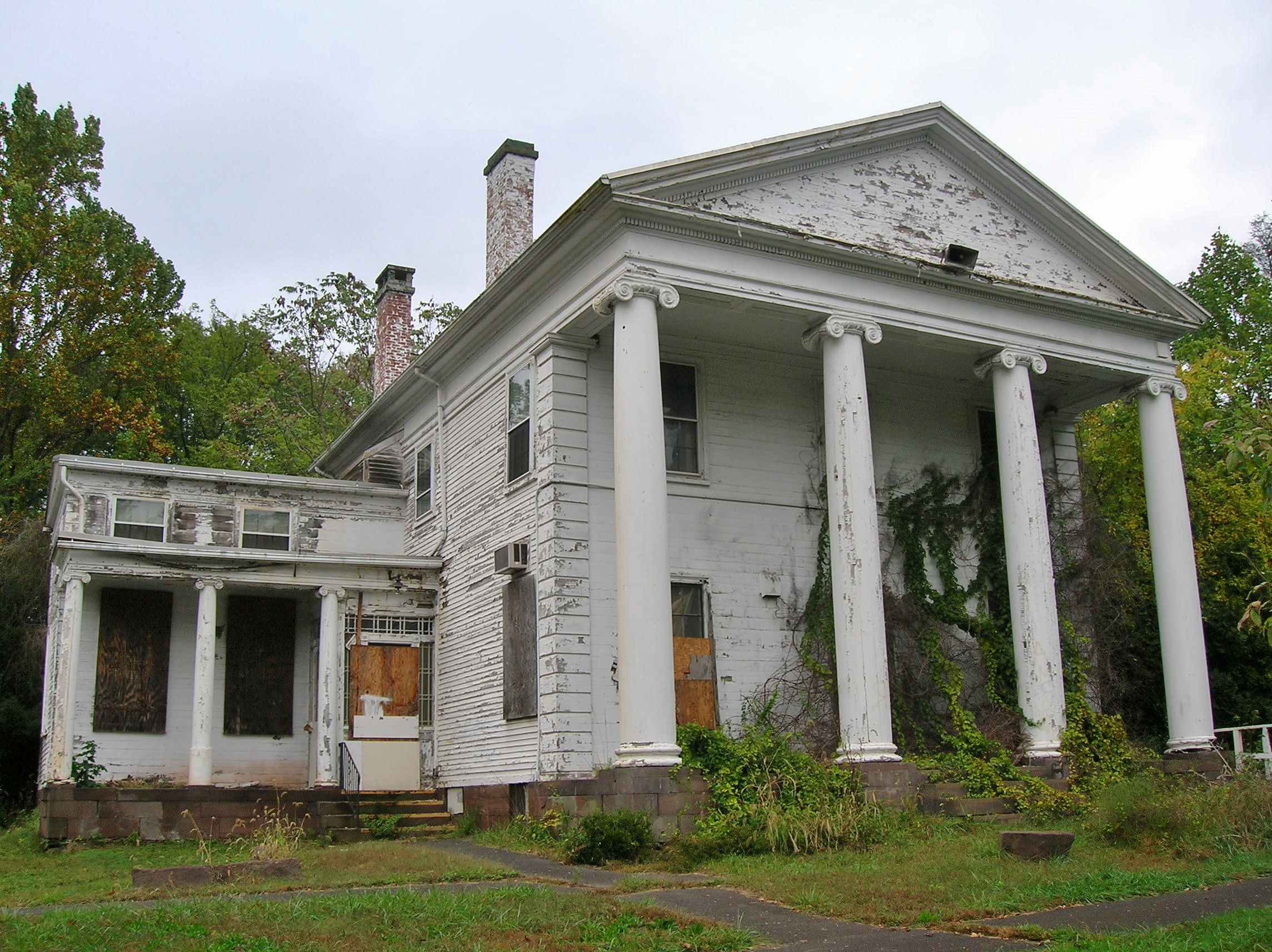
Hart Jarvis House, Portland, CT (October 2017).

Elizabeth Hart Jarvis was born in Saybrook, Connecticut, to Reverend William Jarvis, an Episcopal Minister, and Elizabeth Jarvis. She was the eldest of five children in an affluent and socially prominent family. She "grew up in a lovely 1830s Greek Temple Revival house in Portland," which fell into disrepair and was threatened with demolition, but (as of 2017) may be moved and rehabilitated as part of other area development.

== Marriage to Samuel Colt ==
She met Samuel Colt in 1851 in Newport, Rhode Island, and the two were married in 1856 The couple resided at Armsmear. with Bishop Thomas Church Brownell presiding over the wedding.

The Colts had five children. Two died in infancy; a daughter, named Elizabeth, died at the age of three. In 1861, Samuel Colt died from complications associated with gout and left Elizabeth a pregnant widow. Seven months after his death, the baby was stillborn. Only one child, Caldwell, survived to adulthood, but he drowned at sea at the age of 35.

== At the helm of Colt ==
Following her husband's death in 1862, Mrs. Colt inherited a controlling interest in the manufacturing company (worth $3.5 million at the time, or $113 million, adjusted for inflation to 2025 dollars), and played a key role in rebuilding the main armory following arson in 1864. Her brother, Richard Jarvis took over as president of the company in 1865, following the death of Elisha K. Root, and the two transitioned the company from the end of the American Civil War through the early 20th century, seeing the evolution from percussion revolvers to cartridge revolvers to semiautomatic pistols and machineguns.

Colt served for 22 years as the president of the Union for Home Work, an organization that provided daycare for the children of working mothers. She became the first President of the Hartford Soldiers Aid Society and, in 1869, organized the first Suffragette convention in Connecticut. For these actions, she was dubbed "The First Lady of Hartford".

In 1867, she had an Episcopal church designed by Edward Tuckerman Potter built as a memorial to her husband and the three children they lost. The church's architecture contains guns and gun-smithing tools sculpted in marble to commemorate her husband's life as an arms maker. In 1896, a parish house was built on the site as a memorial to their son, Caldwell, who died in 1894. In 1975, the Church of the Good Shepherd and Parish House was listed in the National Register of Historic Places.

== Retirement and death ==
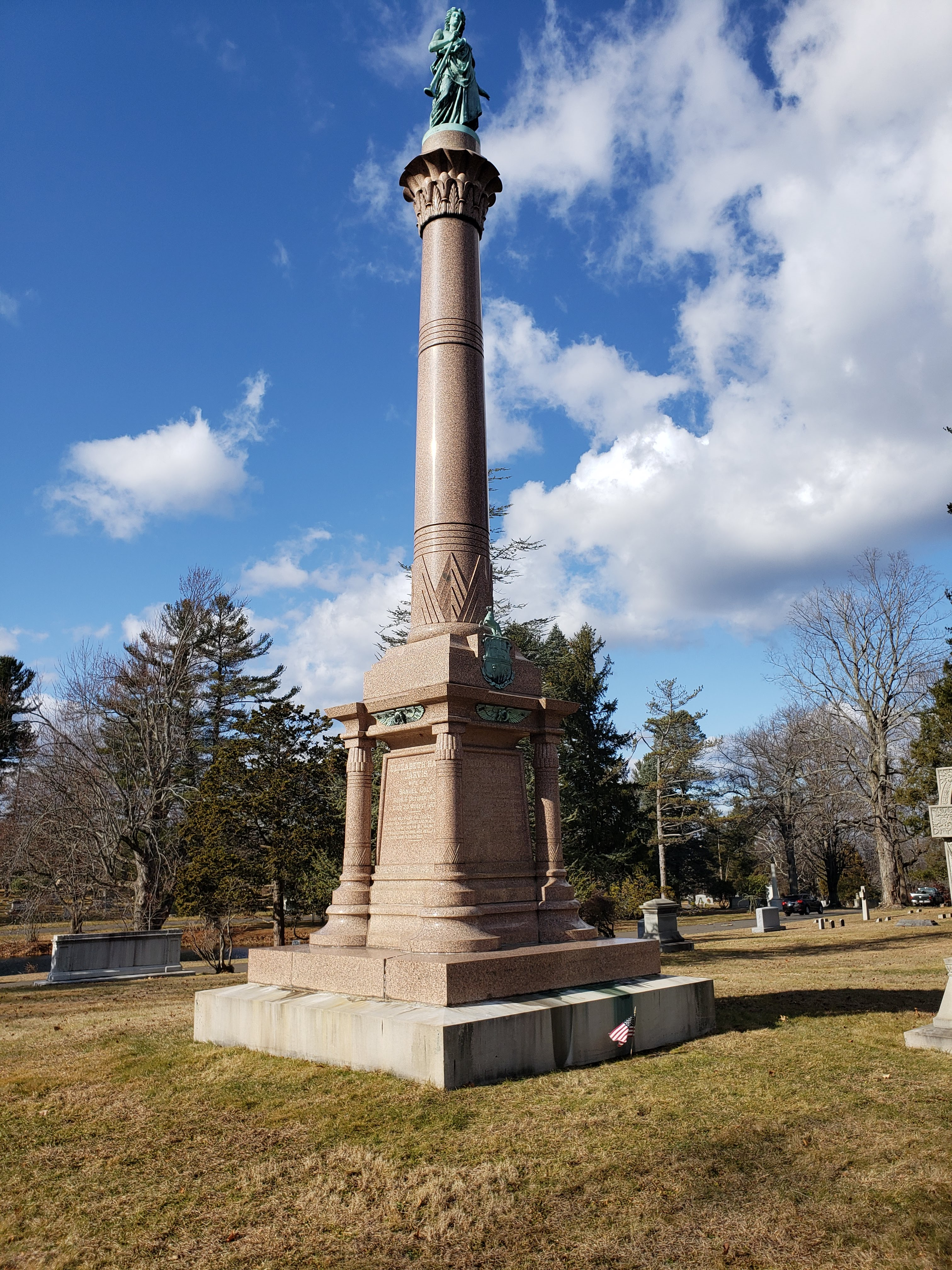
Colt memorial in Cedar Hill Cemetery

She sold her interest in Colt's Manufacturing Company in 1901. She was involved in society life in Hartford, CT and President of the Hartford Women's Auxiliary.

Colt died of paralysis in Newport, Rhode Island, on August 23, 1905. The Hartford Courant ran a full-page obituary of Colt on the front page of the newspaper the following day, calling her the "First Lady of Connecticut". It was the first time that the newspaper recognized the death of a woman in this manner.

In her will, Elizabeth Colt left a collection of nearly 1,000 objects, artworks, firearms and documents to the Wadsworth Atheneum as well as a fund to build the Colt Memorial. The Elizabeth Hart Jarvis Colt Memorial Wing was the first American museum wing bearing the name of a woman patron.

As part of her will, Colt left a sizable collection of Islamic art at the Wadsworth. Many of the works were not seen for over a century, until 2024 with the exhibit Divine Geometry. The organization was curated by Wadsworth curator Hamid Hemat, who formerly worked for the Turquoise Mountain Foundation and subsequently fled the Fall of Kabul (2021).

She is buried along with her husband and children in Hartford's historic Cedar Hill Cemetery.
