= Samuel Colt =

American industrialist and inventor (1814–1862)

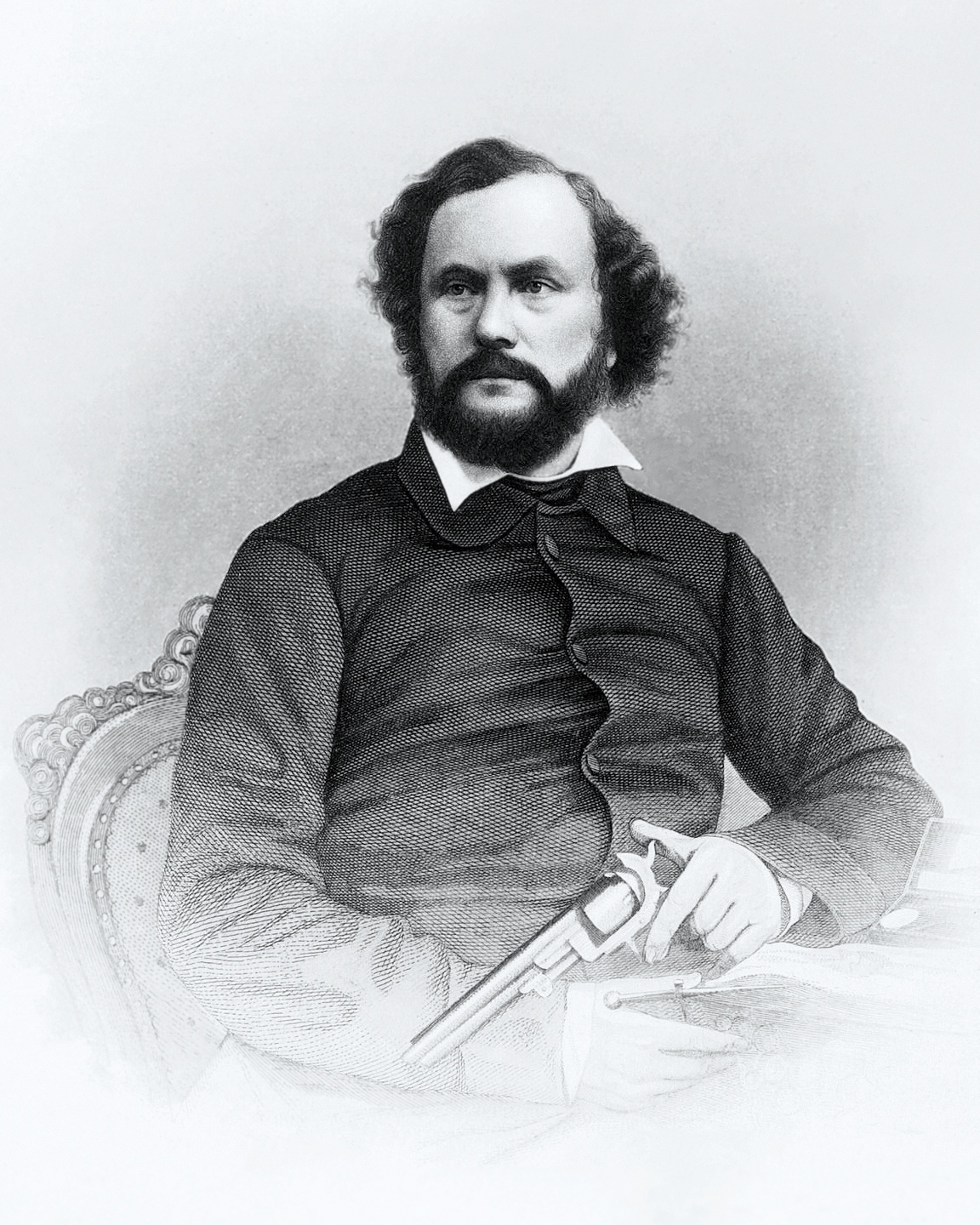
- Engraving by John Chester Buttre, c. 1855
- Born: July 19, 1814; Hartford, Connecticut, U.S.
- Died: January 10, 1862 (aged 47); Hartford, Connecticut, U.S.
- Resting place: Cedar Hill Cemetery, Hartford, Connecticut, U.S.
- Occupations: Inventor, industrialist, businessman, hunter
- Spouse: Elizabeth Hart Jarvis (m. 1856–1862)
- Relatives: John C. Colt (brother); Caldwell Hart Colt (son); Samuel P. Colt (nephew); Roswell L. Colt (cousin)
- Awards: Telford Medal

Samuel Colt (/koʊlt/; July 19, 1814 – January 10, 1862) was an American inventor, industrialist, and businessman who established Colt's Patent Fire-Arms Manufacturing Company and made the mass production of revolvers commercially viable.

Colt's first two business ventures were producing firearms in Paterson, New Jersey, and making underwater mines. His business expanded rapidly after 1847, when the Texas Rangers ordered 1,000 revolvers during the American war with Mexico. During the American Civil War, his factory in Hartford supplied firearms both to the North and the South. Later, his firearms were used widely during the settling of the western frontier. When Colt died in 1862, he was one of the wealthiest men in the United States.

Colt's manufacturing methods were at the forefront of the Industrial Revolution. His use of interchangeable parts helped him become one of the first to make efficient use of the assembly line manufacturing process. Moreover, his innovative use of art, celebrity endorsements, and corporate gifts to promote his wares made him a pioneer in advertising, product placement, and mass marketing.

== Early years (1814–1835) ==
Samuel Colt was born in Hartford, Connecticut, the son of Christopher Colt (1780–1850), a farmer who had moved his family to the city after he became a businessman, and Sarah (née Caldwell). His maternal grandfather, Major John Caldwell, had been an officer in the Continental Army; one of Colt's earliest possessions was John's flintlock pistol. Colt's mother died from tuberculosis when Colt was six years old, and his father married Olivia Sargeant two years later. Colt had three sisters, one of whom died during her childhood. His oldest sister, Margaret, died of tuberculosis at age 19, and the other, Sarah Ann, later died by suicide. One brother, James, became a lawyer; another, Christopher, was a textile merchant. A third brother, John C. Colt, a man of many occupations, was convicted of an 1841 murder and died by suicide on the day he was to be executed.

At age 11, Colt was indentured to a farmer in Glastonbury, where he did chores and attended school. Here he was introduced to the Compendium of Knowledge, a scientific encyclopedia that he preferred to read rather than his Bible studies. Its articles about Robert Fulton and gunpowder motivated Colt throughout his life. He discovered that other inventors in the Compendium had accomplished feats that were once deemed impossible, and he wanted to do the same. Later, after hearing soldiers talk about the success of the double-barreled rifle and the impossibility of a gun that could shoot five or six times without reloading, Colt decided that he would create the "impossible gun".

In 1829, at the age of 15, Colt began working in his father's textile plant in Ware, Massachusetts, where he had access to tools, materials, and the factory workers' expertise. Using what he learned from the Compendium, Samuel built a homemade galvanic cell, and advertised that at a Fourth of July event that year that he would explode a raft on Ware Pond using underwater explosives; although the raft was missed, the explosion was still impressive. Sent to boarding school, he amused his classmates with pyrotechnics. In 1830, a July 4 accident caused a fire that ended his schooling, and his father sent him away to learn the seaman's trade. On a voyage to Calcutta aboard the brig Corvo, Colt had the idea for a type of revolver, inspired by capstans and windlasses, which have a ratchet-and-pawl mechanism he would later say gave him the idea for his revolver designs. On the Corvo, Colt made a wooden model of a pepperbox revolver out of scrap wood. It differed from other pepperbox revolvers at the time in that it allowed the shooter to rotate the cylinder by the action of cocking the hammer, with an attached pawl turning the cylinder, which was then locked firmly in alignment with one of the barrels by a bolt, a great improvement over the earlier designs, which required rotating the barrels by hand and hoping for proper indexing and alignment.

When Colt returned to the United States in 1832, he resumed working for his father, who financed the production of two guns, a rifle and a pistol. The first completed pistol exploded when it was fired, but the rifle performed well. His father would not finance any further development, so Samuel needed to find a way to pay for the development of his ideas. He had learned about nitrous oxide (laughing gas) from the chemist at his father's textile plant, so he took a portable laboratory on tour and earned a living performing laughing gas demonstrations across the United States and Canada, calling himself as "the Celebrated Dr. Colt of New-York, London and Calcutta". Colt thought of himself as a man of science and believed if he could enlighten people about a new idea like nitrous oxide, he could in turn make people more receptive to his new idea concerning a revolver. He started his lectures on street corners and soon worked his way up to lecture halls and museums. As ticket sales declined, Colt realized that "serious" museum lectures were not what the people wanted to pay for; it was dramatic stories of salvation and redemption the public craved. While visiting his brother John in Cincinnati, he partnered with sculptor Hiram Powers for his demonstrations with a theme based on The Divine Comedy. Powers made detailed wax sculptures and paintings based on demons, centaurs, and mummies from Dante's work. Colt constructed fireworks for the finale of the show, which was a success. According to Colt historian Robert Lawrence Wilson, the "lectures launched Colt's celebrated career as a pioneer Madison Avenue-style pitchman". His public speaking skills were so prized that he was thought to be a doctor and was pressed into service to cure an apparent cholera epidemic aboard a riverboat by giving stricken passengers a dose of nitrous oxide.

Having saved some money and still wanting to be considered an inventor as opposed to a "medicine man", Colt made arrangements to begin building guns using proper gunsmiths from Baltimore, Maryland. He abandoned the idea of a multiple-barreled revolver and opted for a single fixed-barrel design with a rotating cylinder. The action of the hammer would align the cylinder bores with the single barrel. He sought the counsel of a friend of his father, Henry Leavitt Ellsworth, who loaned him $300 and advised him to perfect his prototype before applying for a patent. Colt hired a gunsmith by the name of John Pearson to build his revolver. Over the next few years, Colt and Pearson argued about money, but the design improved and by 1835 Colt was ready to apply for his U.S. patent. Ellsworth was now the superintendent of the U.S. Patent Office and advised Colt to file for foreign patents first, as a prior U.S. patent would keep Colt from filing a patent in the United Kingdom. In August 1835, Colt left for England and France to secure his foreign patents.

== Colt's early revolver (1835–1843) ==
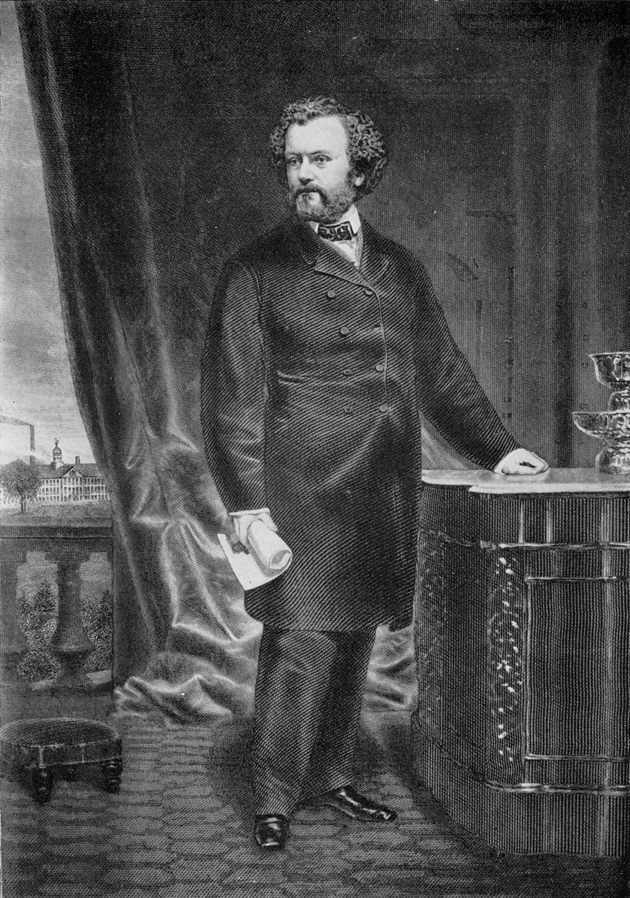
Portrait of Col. Samuel Colt, engraving by George Catlin after a painting by Charles Loring Elliott (Wadsworth Atheneum), Hartford.

Colt's trip to the United Kingdom had been preceded by a similar visit by Elisha Collier, a Bostonian who had patented a revolving flintlock there that achieved great popularity. Despite the reluctance of English officials to issue a patent to Colt, no fault could be found with the gun and he was issued his first patent (number 6909). Upon his return to America, he applied for his U.S. patent for a "revolving gun"; he was granted the patent on February 25, 1836 (later numbered 9430X). This instrument and patent number 1304, dated August 29, 1836, protected the basic principles of his revolving-breech loading, folding trigger firearm named the Colt Paterson.

With a loan from his cousin Dudley Selden and letters of recommendation from Ellsworth, Colt formed a corporation of venture capitalists in 1836 to bring his idea to market. With the help of the political connections of these venture capitalists, the Patent Arms Manufacturing Company of Paterson, New Jersey, was chartered by the New Jersey legislature on March 5, 1836. Colt was given a royalty for each gun sold in exchange for his share of patent rights, and it was stipulated that rights would be returned to Colt if the company disbanded.

Colt never claimed to have invented the revolver; his design was a more practical adaption of Collier's earlier revolving flintlock, incorporating a locking bolt to keep the cylinder aligned with the barrel. The invention of the percussion cap made ignition more reliable, faster, and safer than the older flintlock design. Colt's great contribution was the use of interchangeable parts. Knowing that some gun parts were made by machine, he envisioned all the parts of every Colt gun to be interchangeable and made by machine, to be assembled later by hand. His goal was an assembly line. This is shown in an 1836 letter that Colt wrote to his father in which he said:

The first workman would receive two or three of the most important parts and would affix these and pass them on to the next who would add a part and pass the growing article on to another who would do the same, and so on until the complete arm is put together.

Colt's U.S. revolver patent gave him a monopoly on revolver manufacture until 1857. His was the first practical revolver and the first practical repeating firearm, thanks to progress made in percussion technology. No longer a mere novelty weapon, the revolver became an industrial and cultural legacy, as well as a contribution to the development of war technology, ironically signified in the name of one of his company's later innovations, the "Peacemaker".

== Early problems and failures ==
Although by the end of 1837 the Arms Company had made more than 1,000 weapons, there had been no sales. After the Panic of 1837, the company's underwriters were reluctant to fund the new machinery that Colt needed to make interchangeable parts, so he went on the road to raise money. Demonstrating his gun to people in general stores did not generate the sales volume he needed, so with another loan from his cousin Selden, he went to Washington, D.C., and demonstrated it to President Andrew Jackson. Jackson approved of the gun and wrote Colt a note saying so. With this letter, Colt pushed a bill through Congress endorsing a demonstration for the military, but failed to obtain an appropriation for military purchase of the weapon. A promising order from the state of South Carolina for 50 to 75 pistols was canceled when the company did not produce them quickly enough.

The provisions of the Militia Act of 1808 were a constant problem for Colt, as they required that any arms purchased by a state militia had to be in current service in the United States military. This prevented state militias from allocating funds for the purchase of experimental weapons or foreign weapons.

Colt undermined his own company with his reckless spending. Selden often chastised him for using corporate funds to buy an expensive wardrobe or give lavish gifts to potential clients. Selden twice prohibited Colt from using company money for liquor and fancy dinners; Colt thought getting potential customers inebriated would generate more sales.

The company was given a brief reprieve by the war against the Seminoles in Florida, which provided the first sale of Colt's revolvers and his new revolving rifles. The soldiers in Florida praised the new weapon, but the unusual hammerless design, sixty years ahead of its time, made it difficult to train men who were used to exposed-hammer guns. Many curious soldiers took the locks apart, resulting in broken parts, stripped screw heads and inoperable guns. Colt soon reworked his design to leave the firing hammer exposed, but problems continued. In late 1843, after the loss of payment for the Florida pistols, the Paterson plant closed and a public auction was held in New York City to sell the company's most liquid assets.

== Mines and tinfoil ==
Colt did not refrain long from manufacturing as he turned to selling underwater electrical detonators and waterproof cable of his own invention. Soon after the failure of the Patent Arms Manufacturing Company, he teamed with Samuel Morse to lobby the US government for funds. Colt's waterproof cable, made from tar-coated copper, proved valuable when Morse ran telegraph lines under lakes, rivers, and bays and made attempts to lay a telegraph line under the Atlantic Ocean. Morse used the battery from one of Colt's mines to transmit a telegraph message from Manhattan to Governors Island when his own battery was too weak to send the signal.

As tensions with the British grew toward the end of 1841, Colt demonstrated his underwater mines to the US government, prompting Congress to appropriate funds for his project. In 1842, he used one of the devices to destroy a moving vessel, to the satisfaction of the United States Navy and President John Tyler. However, opposition from John Quincy Adams, who was serving as a U.S. representative from Massachusetts's 8th congressional district, scuttled the project as "not fair and honest warfare", calling the Colt mine an "unchristian contraption".

After this setback, Colt turned his attention to perfecting tinfoil cartridges he had originally designed for use in his revolvers. The standard at the time was to have powder and ball contained in a paper or skin envelope ("cartridge") for ease of loading. However, if the paper got wet, the powder would be ruined. Colt tried alternative materials such as rubber cement, finally deciding on a thin type of tinfoil. In 1841 he made samples of these cartridges for the army. During tests of the foil cartridges, 25 rounds were shot from a musket without cleaning. When the breech plug was removed from the barrel, no fouling from the tin foil was evident. The reception was lukewarm, but the army purchased a few thousand rounds for further testing. In 1843 the army gave Colt an order for 200,000 of the tinfoil cartridges packed 10 to a box for use in muskets.

With the money made from the cartridges, Colt resumed business with Morse for ideas other than detonating mines. Colt concentrated on manufacturing his waterproof telegraph cable, believing the business would prosper in tandem with Morse's invention. He began promoting the telegraph companies to create a greater market for his cable, for which he was to be paid $50 per mile. Colt tried to use this revenue to resurrect the Patent Arms Manufacturing Company, but could not secure funds from other investors or even his own family. This left Colt time to improve his earlier revolver design and have a prototype for his "new and improved revolver" built by a gunsmith in New York. This new revolver had a stationary trigger and a larger caliber. Colt submitted his single prototype to the War Department as a "Holster revolver".

== Colt's Patent Manufacturing Company (1847–1860) ==
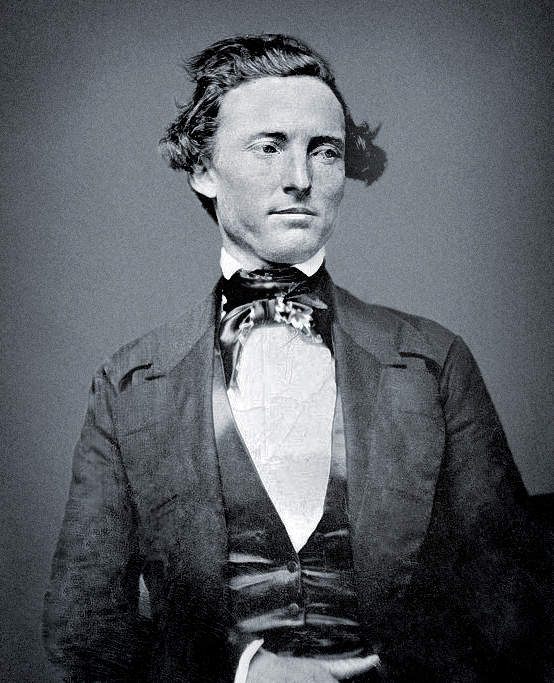
Samuel Hamilton Walker (1817–1847)

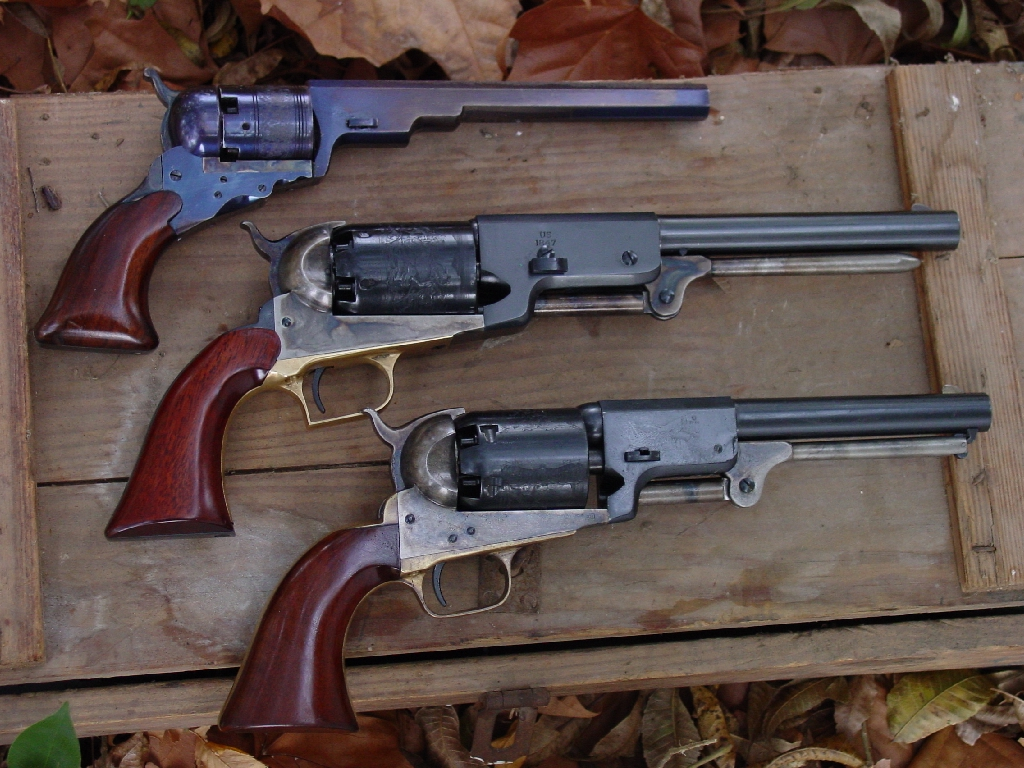
Modern reproductions of the Colt Paterson [top] and Colt Walker (middle)

Captain Samuel Walker of the Texas Rangers had acquired some of the first Colt revolvers produced during the Seminole War and saw firsthand their effective use when his 15-man unit defeated a larger force of 70 Comanches in Texas. Walker wanted to order Colt revolvers for use by the Rangers in the Mexican–American War and traveled to New York City in search of Colt. On January 4, 1847, he met Colt in a gunsmith's shop and ordered 1,000 revolvers. Walker asked for a few changes: the new revolvers would have to hold six shots instead of five, have enough power to kill either a human or a horse with a single shot, and be quicker to reload. The large order allowed Colt to establish a new firearm business. He hired Eli Whitney III, who was established in the arms business at the Whitney Armory, to make his guns. Colt used his prototype and Walker's improvements as the basis for a new design. From this new design, known as the Colt Walker, Whitney produced the first thousand-piece order. The company then received an order for a thousand more; Colt shared the profits at $10 per pistol for both orders.

With the money he made from the sales of the Walkers and a loan from his cousin, banker Elisha Colt, Colt bought the machinery and tooling from Whitney to build his own factory: Colt's Patent Fire-Arms Manufacturing Company factory at Hartford. The first revolving-breech pistols made at the factory were named "Whitneyville-Hartford-Dragoons" and became so popular that the word "Colt" was often used as a generic term for "revolver". The Whitneyville-Hartford Dragoon, largely built from leftover Walker parts, is known as the first model in the transition from the Walker to the Dragoon series. Beginning in 1848, more contracts followed for what is known now as the Colt Dragoon Revolver. These models were based on the Walker Colt, and slight changes to each model over three generations marked the rapid evolution of the design. The improvements were: 7 1/2-inch (190 mm) barrels for accuracy, shorter chambers, and an improved loading lever. The shorter chambers were loaded to 50 grains of powder, instead of 60 grains in the earlier Walkers, to prevent ruptured cylinders. Finally, a positive catch was installed at the end of the loading lever to prevent the lever from dropping due to recoil.

Besides being used in the Mexican–American War, Colt's revolvers were employed as a sidearm by both civilians and soldiers. Colt's revolvers were a key tool of the westward expansion: a revolver which could fire six times without reloading helped soldiers and settlers fend off larger forces not armed in the same way. In 1848 Colt introduced smaller versions of his pistols for civilian use, known as "Baby Dragoons". In 1850 General Sam Houston and General Thomas Jefferson Rusk lobbied Secretary of War William Marcy and President James K. Polk to adopt Colt's revolvers for the U.S. military. Rusk testified: "Colt's Repeating Arms are the most efficient weapons in the world and the only weapon which has enabled the frontiersman to defeat the mounted Indian in his own peculiar mode of warfare." Lt. Bedley McDonald, a subordinate of Walker at the time Walker was killed in Mexico, stated that 30 Rangers used Colt's revolvers to keep over 300 Mexicans in check. Colt followed this design with the Colt 1851 Navy Revolver, which was larger than the Baby Dragoon but not quite as large as the full-sized version. It became the standard sidearm for U.S. military officers and also proved popular among civilian buyers. After the testimony by Houston and Rusk, the next issue became how quickly Colt could supply the military. Ever the opportunist, when the war with Mexico ended, Colt sent agents south of the border to procure sales from the Mexican government.

=== Patent extension ===
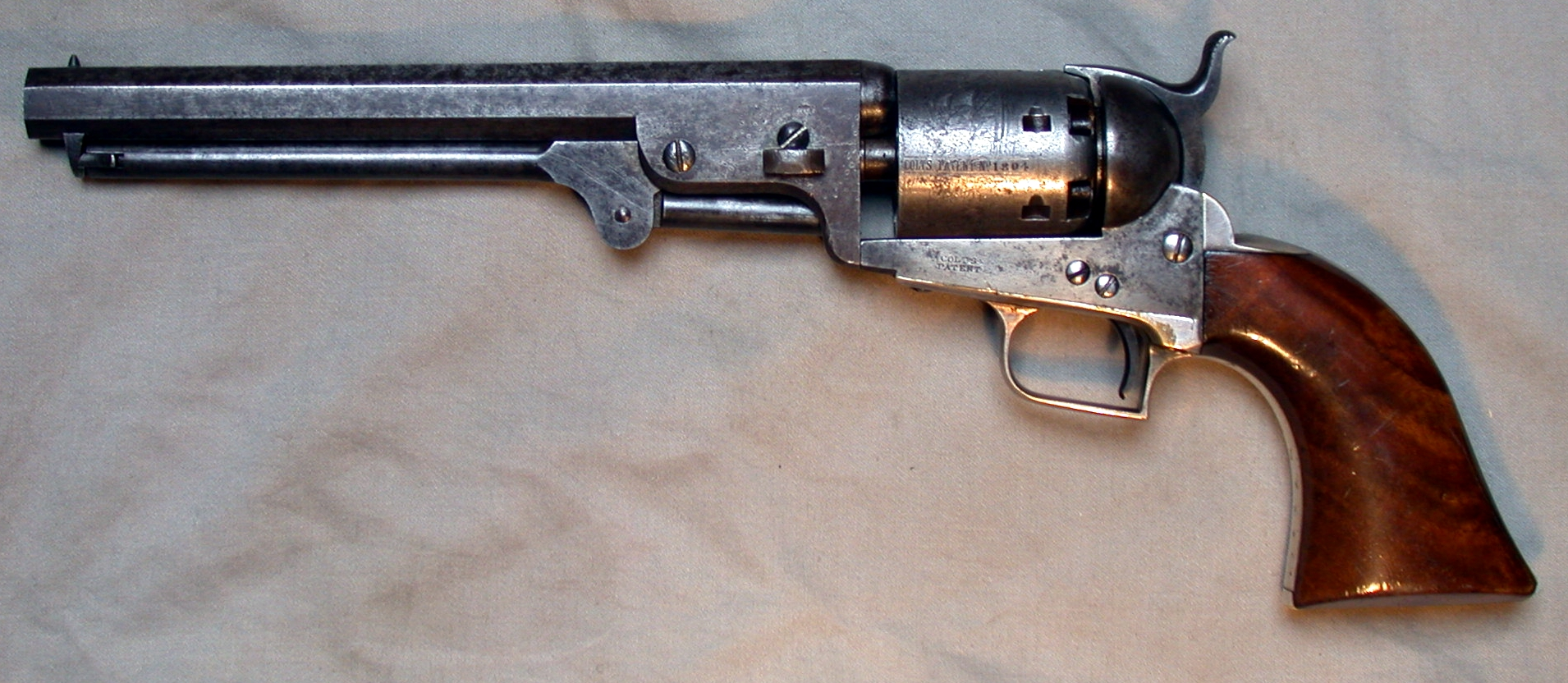
Colt 1851 Navy Revolver

During this period, Colt received an extension on his patent, since he had not collected fees for it in its early years. In 1849, gun makers James Warner and Massachusetts Arms infringed on the patent. Colt sued the companies, and the court ordered that Warner and Massachusetts Arms cease revolver production. In 1852, Colt threatened to sue another company, Allen & Thurber, over the cylinder design of their double-action pepperbox revolver. However, Colt's lawyers doubted that this suit would be successful, and the case was resolved with a settlement of $15,000. Production of Allen pepperboxes continued until the expiration of Colt's patent in 1857. In 1854 Colt fought for his patent extension with the U.S. Congress, which initiated a special committee to investigate charges that Colt had bribed government officials in securing this extension. By August he was exonerated, and the story became national news when Scientific American magazine reported that the fault was not with Colt, but with Washington politicians. With a virtual monopoly, Colt sold his pistols in Europe, where demand was high due to tense international relations. By telling each nation that the others were buying Colt's pistols, Colt was able to get large orders from many countries who feared falling behind in the arms race.

A major reason for Colt's success was vigorous protection of his patent rights. Even though he held the only lawful patent for his type of revolver, scores of imitators copied his work and Colt found himself constantly in litigation. In each case, Colt's lawyer, Edward N. Dickerson, deftly exploited the patent system and successfully shut down the competitor. However, Colt's zealous protection of his patents greatly impeded firearms development as a whole in the United States. His preoccupation with patent infringement suits slowed his own company's transition to the cartridge system and prevented other firms from pursuing revolver designs. At the same time, Colt's policies forced some competing inventors to greater innovation by denying them key features of his mechanism; as a result, they created their own.

Colt knew he had to make his revolvers affordable, as the doom of many great inventions was a high retail price. Colt fixed his prices at a level below his competition to maximize sales volume. From his experience in haggling with government officials, he knew what numbers he would have to generate to make enough profit to invest money in improving his machinery, thereby limiting imitators' ability to produce a comparable weapon at a lower price.

Although successful at this, for the most part, his preoccupation with marketing strategies and patent protection caused him to miss a great opportunity in firearms development when he dismissed an idea from one of his gunsmiths, Rollin White. White had the idea of a "bored-through" revolver cylinder to allow cartridges (made of paper at the time) to be loaded from the rear of the cylinder. Only one gun fitting White's design was ever made, and it was not considered practical for the ammunition of the time. A year after White left Colt, Colt's competitor, Smith & Wesson, attempted to patent a revolver using metallic cartridges only to find that it infringed on White's patent for the bored-through cylinder. They then licensed that component of White's patent and kept Colt from being able to build cartridge firearms for almost 20 years.

=== Colt's armories ===
==== Hartford ====
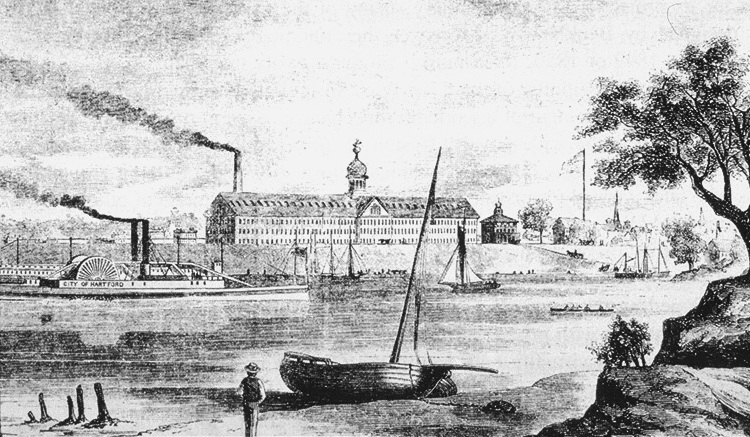
Colt's Armory, viewed from the east, from an 1857 engraving

Colt purchased a large tract of land beside the Connecticut River, where he built: his first factory in 1848; a larger factory (the Colt Armory) in 1855; the manor Armsmear in 1856; and employee tenement housing. He established a ten-hour work day for employees, installed washing stations in the factory, mandated a one-hour lunch break, and built the Charter Oak Hall, where employees could enjoy games, newspapers, and discussion rooms. Colt managed his plant with a military-like discipline: he would dismiss workers for tardiness, sub-par work, or even suggesting improvements to his designs.

As he set up his plant's machinery, Colt hired Elisha K. Root as his chief mechanic. Root had been successful in an earlier venture automating the production of axes and made, bought, or improved jigs, fixtures and profile machinery for Colt. Over the years he developed specialized machinery for stock turning or cutting the rifling in gun barrels. Historian Barbara Clark credited Root as "the first to build special purpose machinery and apply it to the manufacture of a commercial product." Colt historian Herbert G. Houze wrote, "Had it not been for Root's inventive genius, Colt's dream of mass production would never have been realized."

Thus, Colt's factory was one of the first to make use of the concept known as the assembly line. The idea was not new but was never successful in industry at the time because of the lack of interchangeable parts. Root's machinery changed that for Colt, since the machines completed as much as 80% of the work and less than 20% of the parts required hand fitting and filing. Colt's revolvers were made by machine, but he insisted on final hand finishing and polishing of his revolvers to impart a handmade feel. Colt hired artisan gun makers from Bavaria and developed a commercial use for Waterman Ormsby's grammagraph to produce "roll-die" engraving on steel, particularly on the cylinders. He hired Bavarian engraver Gustave Young for fine hand engraving on his more "custom" pieces. In an attempt to attract skilled European-immigrant workers to his plant, Colt built a village near the factory away from the tenements which he named Coltsville and modeled the homes after a village in Potsdam. In an effort to stem flooding from the river he planted German osiers, a type of willow tree, in a 2-mile-long dike. He subsequently built a factory to manufacture wicker furniture made from these trees.

On June 5, 1856, Colt married Elizabeth Jarvis, the daughter of the Rev. William Jarvis, who lived downriver from Hartford. The wedding was lavish and featured the ceremony on a steamship overlooking the factory as well as fireworks and rifle salutes. The couple had four children: two daughters and a son who died in infancy and a son born in 1858, Caldwell Hart Colt.

==== London ====
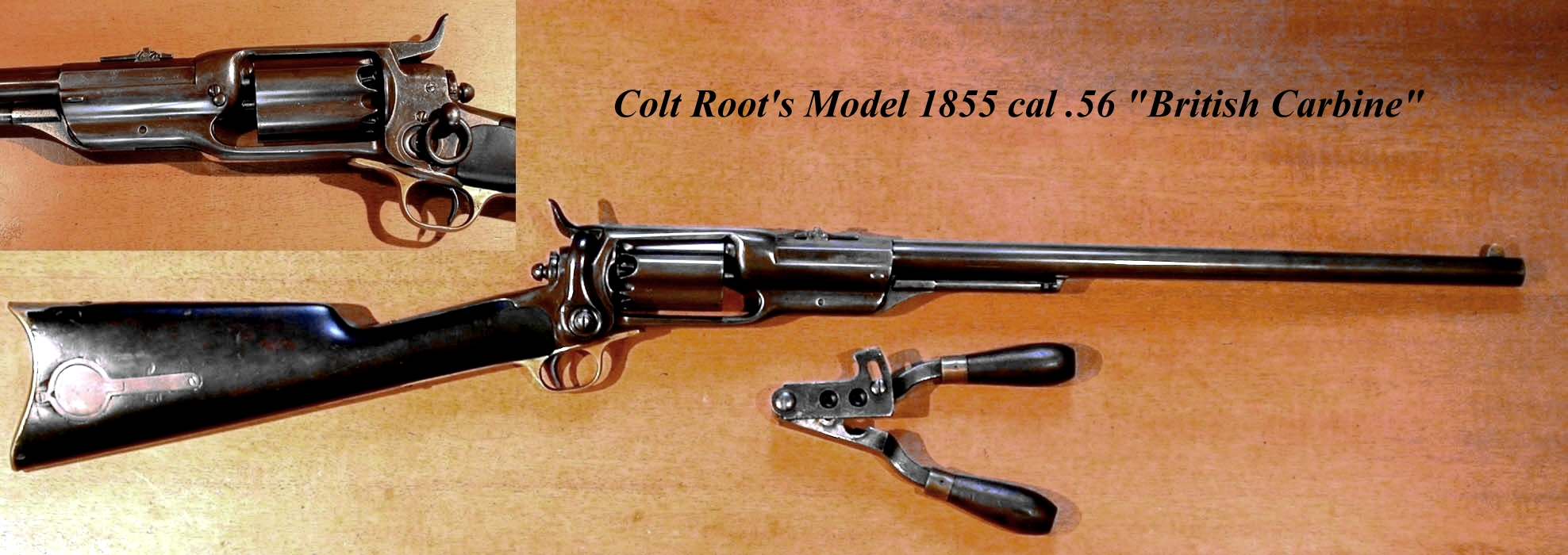
Colt Model 1855 Carbine with London proofmarks

Soon after establishing his Hartford factory, Colt decided to establish another factory in or near Europe, and chose London. He organized a large display of his firearms at the Great Exhibition of 1851 at Hyde Park, London and ingratiated himself by presenting cased engraved Colt revolvers to such appropriate officials as Britain's Master General of the Ordnance. At one exhibit Colt disassembled ten guns and reassembled ten guns using different parts from different guns. As the world's leading proponent of mass production techniques, Colt delivered a lecture concerning the subject to the Institution of Civil Engineers (ICE) in London. The membership rewarded his efforts by awarding him the Silver Telford Medal. With help from ICE secretary Charles Manby Colt established his London operation near Vauxhall Bridge on the River Thames and began production on January 1, 1853. During a tour of the factory, Charles Dickens was so impressed with the facilities that he later published his comments on Colt's revolvers in an 1852 issue of Household Words magazine:

Among the pistols, we saw Colt's revolver; and we compared it with the best English revolver. The advantage of Colt's over the English is, that the user can take a sight; and the disadvantage is, that the weapon requires both hands to fire.

The factory's machines mass-produced parts that were completely interchangeable and could be put together on assembly lines using standardized patterns and gauges by unskilled labor, as opposed to England's top gun makers, who made each part by hand.

Colt's London factory remained in operation for only four years. Unwilling to alter his open-top single-action design for the solid frame double-action revolver that the British asked for, Colt sold scarcely 23,000 revolvers to the British Army and Navy. In 1856 he closed the London plant and had the machinery, tooling, and unfinished guns shipped to Hartford.

=== Marketing ===
When foreign heads of state would not grant him an audience, as he was only a private citizen, he persuaded the governor of the state of Connecticut to make him a lieutenant colonel and aide-de-camp of the state militia. With this rank, he toured Europe again to promote his revolvers. He used marketing techniques which were innovative at the time. He frequently gave custom engraved versions of his revolvers to heads of state, military officers, and celebrities such as Giuseppe Garibaldi, King Victor Emmanuel II of Italy, and Hungarian rebel Lajos Kossuth. In the earliest use of product placement advertising, Colt commissioned American frontier painter George Catlin to produce a series of paintings depicting exotic scenes in which a Colt weapon was prominently used against Indians, wild animals, or bandits. He placed numerous advertisements in the same newspapers; The Knickerbocker published as many as eight in the same edition. He also hired authors to write stories about his guns for magazines and travel guides. One of Colt's more significant acts of self-promotion was a $1,120 payment ($61,439 in 1999 dollars) to the publishers of United States Magazine for a 29-page fully illustrated story showing the inner workings of his factory.

After his revolvers had gained acceptance, Colt had his staff search for unsolicited news stories mentioning his guns that he could excerpt and reprint. He went so far as to hire agents in other states and territories to find such samples, to buy hundreds of copies for himself and to give the editor a free revolver for writing them, particularly if such a story disparaged his competition. Many of the revolvers Colt gave away as "gifts" had inscriptions such as "Compliments of Col. Colt" or "From the Inventor" engraved on the back straps. Later versions contained his entire signature which was used in many of his advertisements as a centerpiece, using his celebrity as a seeming guarantee of the performance of his weapons. Colt eventually secured a trademark for his signature.

One of his slogans, “God created men, Col. Colt made them equal,” (claiming that any person could, regardless of physical strength, defend themselves with a Colt gun) became a popular adage in American culture.

== Later years and death ==
In the period leading up to the American Civil War, Colt supplied both the North and the South with firearms. He had been known to sell weapons to warring parties on both sides of other conflicts in Europe and did the same with respect to the war in America. In 1859 Colt considered building an armory in the South and as late as 1861 had sold 2,000 revolvers to Confederate agent John Forsyth. Although trade with the South had not been restricted at that time, newspapers such as the New York Daily Tribune, The New York Times and the Hartford Daily Courant labeled him a Southern sympathizer and traitor to the Union. In response to these charges, Colt was commissioned as a colonel by the state of Connecticut on May 16, 1861, in the 1st Regiment Colts Revolving Rifles of Connecticut armed with the Colt revolving rifle. Colt envisioned this unit as being staffed by men over six feet tall and armed with his weapons. However, the unit was never deployed and Colt was discharged a month later, on June 20.

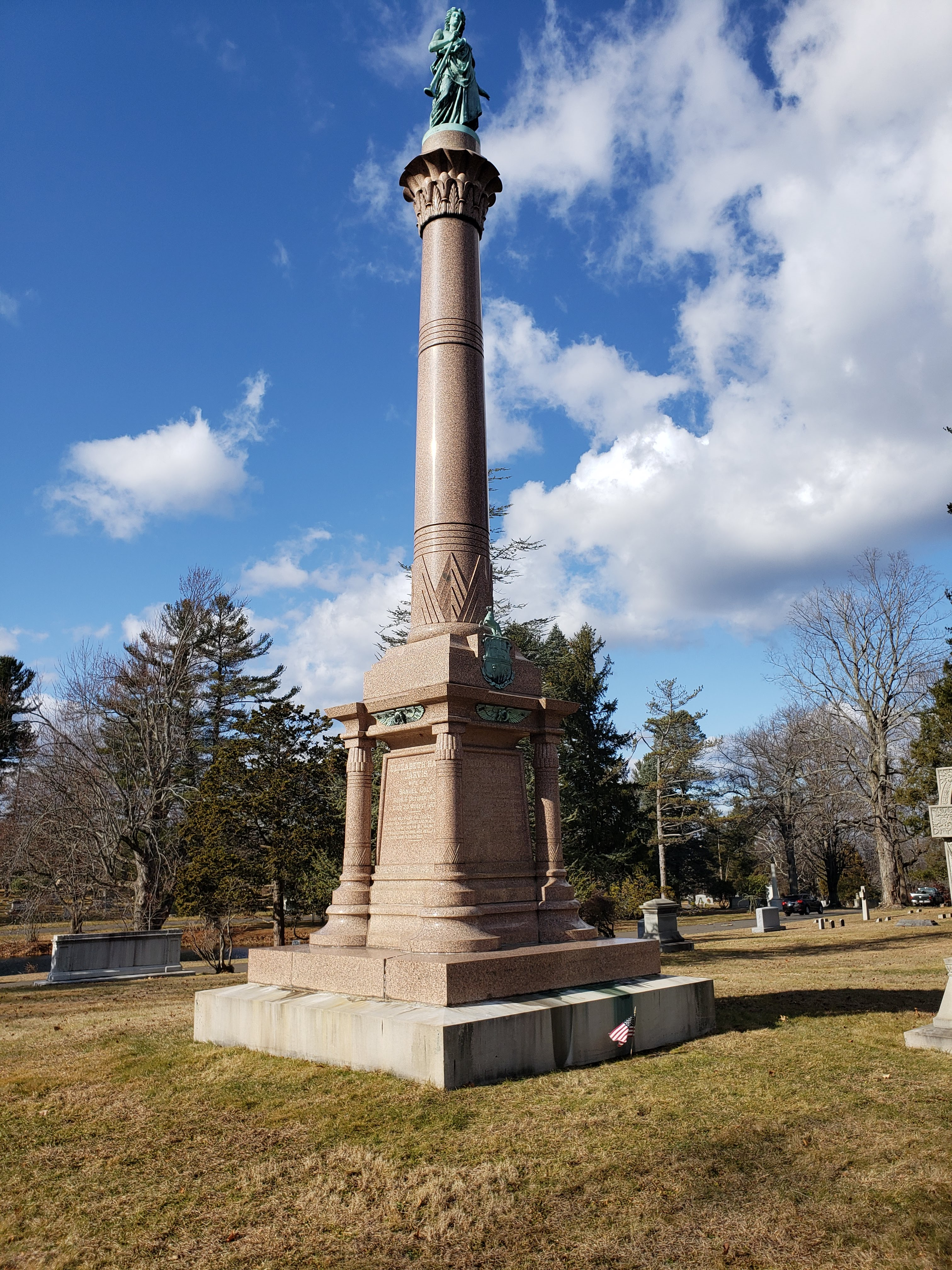
Samuel Colt memorial in Cedar Hill Cemetery

Samuel Colt died of complications of gout in Hartford on January 10, 1862. He was interred on the property of his private residence Armsmear and reinterred at Cedar Hill Cemetery in 1894. At the time of his death, Colt's estate, which he willed to his wife and three-year-old son Caldwell Hart Colt, was estimated to be valued at about $15,000,000 (equivalent to US$484,000,000 in 2025). His professional responsibilities were turned over to his brother-in-law, Richard Jarvis. The only other person mentioned in Colt's will was Samuel Caldwell Colt, the son of his brother, John C. Colt.

Colt historian William Edwards wrote that Samuel Colt had married Caroline Henshaw (who later married his brother, John) in Scotland during 1838, and that the son she bore later was Samuel Colt's and not his brother John's. In a 1953 biography about Samuel Colt based largely on family letters, Edwards wrote that John Colt's marriage to Caroline in 1841 was a way to legitimize her unborn son, as the real father, Samuel Colt, felt she was not fit to be the wife of an industrialist and divorce was a social stigma at the time. After John's death, Samuel Colt provided financial support for the child, named Samuel Caldwell Colt, with a large allowance, and paid for his tuition in what were described as "the finest private schools." In correspondence to and about his namesake, Samuel Colt referred to him as his "nephew" in quotes. Historians such as Edwards and Harold Schechter have said this was the elder Colt's way of letting the world know that the boy was his own son without saying so directly. After Colt's death, he left the boy an amount equivalent to $2 million in 2010 dollars. Colt's widow, Elizabeth Jarvis Colt, and her brother, Richard Jarvis contested this. In probate court Caroline's son Sam produced a valid marriage license showing that Caroline and Samuel Colt were married in Scotland in 1838 and that this document made him a rightful heir to part of Colt's estate, if not to the Colt Manufacturing Company.

Colt was a Freemason.

== Legacy ==
It is estimated that in its first 25 years of manufacturing, Colt's company produced more than 400,000 revolvers. Before his death, each barrel was stamped: "Address Col. Samuel Colt, New York, US America", or a variation using a London address. Colt did this as New York and London were major cosmopolitan cities and he retained an office in New York at 155 Broadway where he based his salesmen.

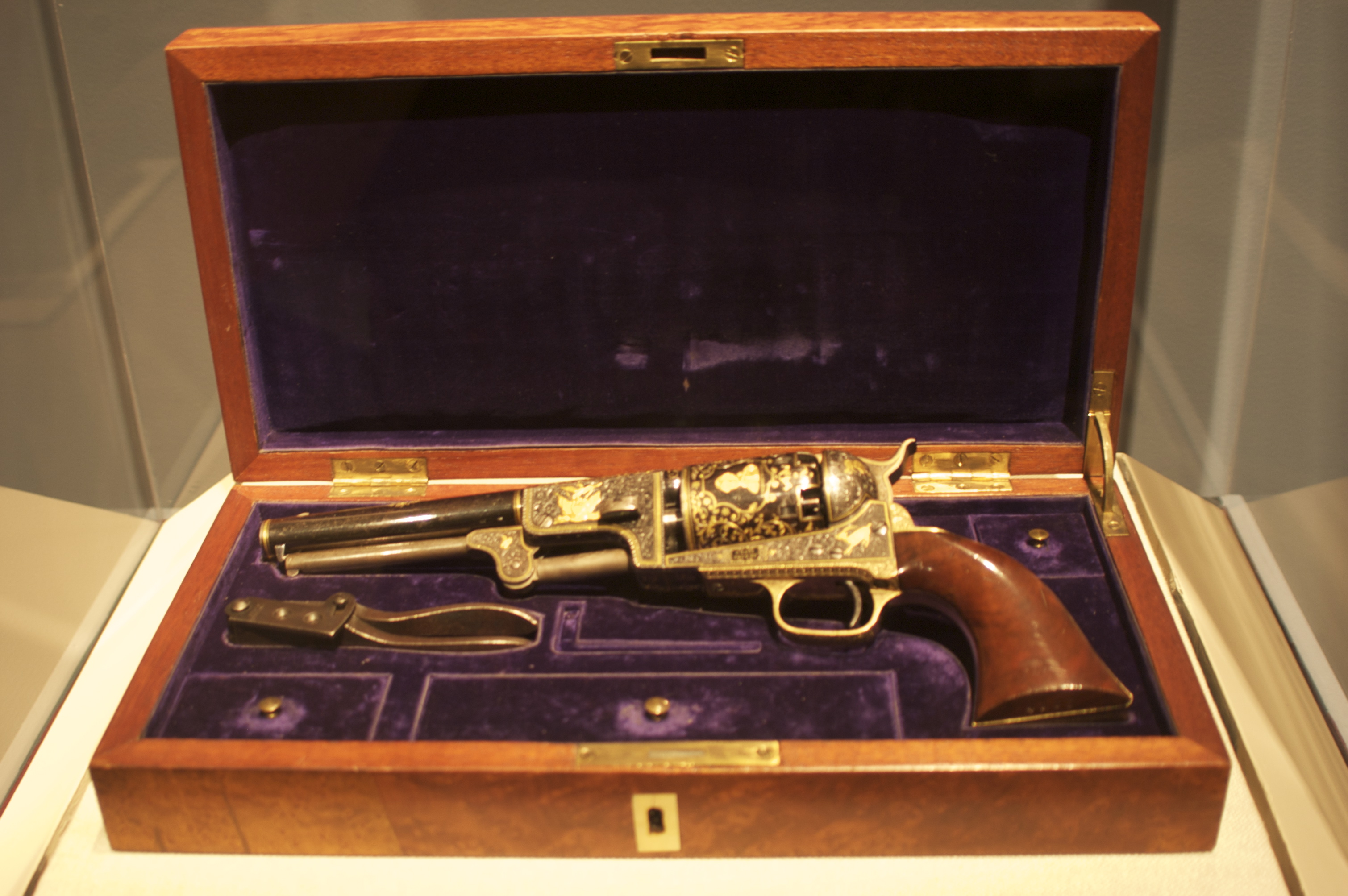
A Dragoon revolver, Colt's gift to the Sultan of the Ottoman Empire

Colt was the first American manufacturer to use art as a marketing tool when he hired Catlin to prominently display Colt firearms in his paintings. He was awarded numerous government contracts after making gifts of his highly embellished and engraved revolvers, with exotic grips such as ivory or pearl, to government officials. On a visit to what was then Constantinople, he gave a custom-engraved and gold inlaid revolver to the Sultan of the Ottoman Empire Abdülmecid I, informing him that the Russians were buying his pistols, thus securing a Turkish order for 5,000 pistols; he neglected to tell the Sultan he had used the same tactic with the Russians to elicit an order.

Apart from gifts and bribes, Colt employed an effective marketing program which comprised sales promotion, publicity, product sampling, and public relations. He used the press to his own advantage by giving revolvers to editors, prompting them to report "all the accidents that occur to the Sharps & other humbug arms", and listing incidents where Colt weapons had been "well used against bears, Indians, Mexicans, etc". Colt's firearms did not always fare well in standardized military tests; he preferred written testimonials from individual soldiers who used his weapons and these were what he most relied on to secure government contracts.

Colt felt that bad press was just as important as good press, provided that his name and his revolvers received mention. When he opened the London armory, he posted a 14-foot sign on the roof across from Parliament reading: "Colonel Colt's Pistol Factory" as a publicity stunt, which created a stir in the British press. Eventually the British government forced him to take the sign down. Colt historian Herbert Houze wrote that Colt championed the concept of modernism before the word was coined, pioneered the use of celebrity endorsements to promote his products, introduced the phrase "new and improved" to advertising, and demonstrated the commercial value of brand awareness—as a word for "revolver" in French is le colt. Barbara M. Tucker, professor of history and director of the Center for Connecticut Studies at Eastern Connecticut State University, wrote that Colt's marketing techniques transformed the firearm from a utilitarian object into a symbol of American identity. Tucker added that Colt associated his revolvers with American patriotism, freedom, and individualism while asserting America's technological supremacy over Europe.

In 1867 Colt's widow Elizabeth had an Episcopal church designed by Edward Tuckerman Potter built as a memorial to him and the three children they lost. The church's architecture contains guns and gun-smithing tools sculpted in marble to commemorate Colt's life as an arms maker. In 1896, a parish house was built on the site as a memorial to their son, Caldwell, who died in 1894. In 1975, the Church of the Good Shepherd and Parish House was listed in the National Register of Historic Places.

Colt established libraries and educational programs within his armories for his employees, which provided training for several generations of toolmakers and other machinists, who had great influence on other manufacturing efforts over the next half century. Prominent examples included Francis A. Pratt, Amos Whitney, Henry Leland, Edward Bullard, Worcester R. Warner, Charles Brinckerhoff Richards, William Mason and Ambrose Swasey.

In 2006, Samuel Colt was inducted into the National Inventors Hall of Fame.

== Bibliography ==
- Adler, Dennis (2008). Colt Single Action: From Patersons to Peacemakers. Edison, New Jersey: Chartwell Books. p. 309. ISBN 978-0-7858-2305-6.
- Auerbach, Jeffrey A. (1999). The Great Exhibition of 1851: a nation on display. New Haven, Connecticut: Yale University Press. ISBN 978-0-300-08007-0.
- Bainbridge, Jr., John (2022). Gun Barons: the weapons that transformed America and the men who invented them. New York: St. Martin's Press. ISBN 978-1-250-26686-6.
- Barnard, Henry (1866). Armsmear: the home, the arm, and the armory of Samuel Colt: A memorial. New York: Alvord Printer.
- Bowman, H. W. (1963). Lucian Cary (ed.). Antique Guns. Abridged Edition Fawcett Book 553 (4th print ed.). Greenwich, Connecticut: Fawcett Publications.
- Carey, Arthur Merwyn (1953). American firearms makers: When, where, and what they made from the Colonial period to the end of the nineteenth century. Springfield, Ohio: Crowell.
- Dickens, Charles (1854). "Guns and Pistols". Household Words. 4: 583.
- Edwards, William B. (1953). The Story of Colt's Revolver: The Biography of Col. Samuel Colt. Harrisburg, Pennsylvania: Stackpole Company.
- Evans, Harold; Buckland, Gail; Lefer, David (2004). They Made America: From the Steam Engine to the Search Engine: Two Centuries of Innovators. Boston: Little, Brown and Co. ISBN 0-316-27766-5.
- Foster-Harris, William (2007). The Look of the Old West: A Fully Illustrated Guide. New York: Skyhorse Publishing. ISBN 978-1-60239-024-9.
- Gibby, Darin (2011). Why America Has Stopped Inventing. Hampton, Virginia: Morgan James Publishing. ISBN 978-1-61448-049-5.
- Haven, Charles Tower; Belden, Frank A. (1940). A History of the Colt Revolver: And the Other Arms Made by Colt's Patent Fire Arms Manufacturing Company from 1836 to 1940. New York: W. Morrow & company.
- Hosley, William (1996). Colt: The Making of an American Legend. Amherst: University of Massachusetts Press. ISBN 978-1-55849-042-0.
- Hosley, William (1999). "Guns, Gun Culture, and the Peddling of Dreams". In Jan E. Dizard; Robert M. Muth; Stephen P. Andrews (eds.). Guns in America: a reader. New York: NYU Press. pp. 47–85. ISBN 978-0-8147-1879-7.
- Hounshell, David A. (1984), From the American System to Mass Production, 1800–1932: The Development of Manufacturing Technology in the United States, Baltimore, Maryland: Johns Hopkins University Press, ISBN 978-0-8018-2975-8, LCCN 83016269, OCLC 1104810110
- Lundeberg, Philip K., Samuel Colt's submarine battery: the secret and the enigma. Washington, Smithsonian Institution Press, 1974.
- Houze, Herbert G.; Cooper, Carolyn C.; Kornhauser, Elizabeth Mankin (2006). Samuel Colt: arms, art, and invention. New Haven, Connecticut: Yale University Press. ISBN 978-0-300-11133-0.
- Klepper, Michael; Gunther, Michael (1996). The Wealthy 100: From Benjamin Franklin to Bill Gates – A Ranking of the Richest Americans, Past and Present. Secaucus, New Jersey: Carol Publishing Group. p. xiii. ISBN 978-0-8065-1800-8. OCLC 33818143.
- Lehto, Mark R.; Buck, James R. (2008). Introduction to human factors and ergonomics for engineers. New York: Taylor & Francis. ISBN 978-0-8058-5308-7.
- Lendler, Marc (1997). Crisis and political beliefs: the case of the Colt Firearms strike. New Haven, Connecticut: Yale University Press. ISBN 978-0-300-06746-0.
- Mann, E.B. (1982). "Colt: the man behind the gun". Field & Stream. 86 (4).
- Mappen, Marc (2004). "Colt, Samuel". In Maxine N. Lurie (ed.). Encyclopedia of New Jersey. Piscataway, New Jersey: Rutgers University Press. ISBN 978-0-8135-3325-4.
- Roe, Joseph Wickham (1916), English and American Tool Builders, New Haven, Connecticut: Yale University Press, LCCN 16011753. Reprinted by McGraw-Hill, New York and London, 1926 (LCCN 27-24075); and by Lindsay Publications, Inc., Bradley, Illinois (ISBN 978-0-917914-73-7).
- Rohan, Jack (1935). Yankee Arms Maker: the incredible career of Samuel Colt (1st ed.). New York: Harper and Brothers Publishers.
- Sapp, Rick (2007). Standard Catalog of Colt Firearms. Iola, Wisconsin: F+W Media, Inc. ISBN 978-0-89689-534-8.
- Schechter, Harold (2010). Killer Colt: Murder, Disgrace, and the Making of an American Legend. New York: Random House. ISBN 978-0-345-47681-4.
- Schiffer, Michael B. (2008). Power struggles: scientific authority and the creation of practical electricity before Edison. Cambridge, Massachusetts: MIT Press. ISBN 978-0-262-19582-9.
- Serven, J.E.; Metzger, C. (1946). Paterson Pistols, First of the Famous Repeating Firearms patented and promoted by Samuel Colt. New York: Foundation Press.
- Smith, Anthony (2004). "From Whittling to Peacemaking". Machine Gun: The Story of the Men and the Weapon That Changed the Face of War. New York: Macmillan. ISBN 978-0-312-93477-4.
- Soule, Gardner (1961). "The Story of Sam Colt's Equalizer". Popular Science. 179 (6): 89.
- Tucker, Barbara M.; Tucker, Kenneth H. (2008). Industrializing antebellum America: the rise of manufacturing entrepreneurs in the early republic. New York: Macmillan. ISBN 978-1-4039-8480-7.
- Tucker, Spencer C.; Pierpaoli, Paul G.; White, William E. (2010). The Civil War Naval Encyclopedia, Volume 1. Santa Barbara, California: ABC-CLIO. ISBN 978-1-59884-338-5.
- Warshauer, Matthew (2011). Connecticut in the American Civil War: slavery, sacrifice, and survival|. Middletown, Connecticut: Wesleyan University Press. ISBN 978-0-8195-7138-0.
- Wilson, R. L. (1991). Colt: An American Legend. New York: Abbeville Press. ISBN 978-0-89659-953-6.
- Lawson, John Davison, ed. (1914). "The Trial of John C. Colt for the Murder of Samuel Adams". American State Trials: a Collection of the Important and Interesting Criminal Trials which have taken place in the United States from the Beginning of our Government to the Present Day. Thomas Law Books.
