= Robert Fish (shipbuilder) =

American pilot

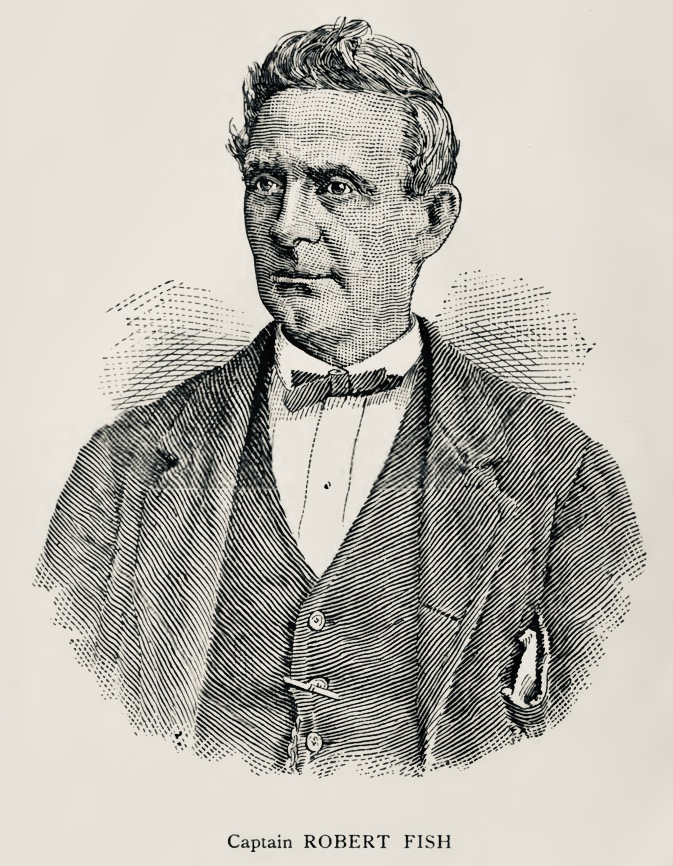
- Born: 1812; New York
- Died: January 18, 1883 (aged 71); Pamrapo, New Jersey, US
- Occupation: shipbuilder
- Spouse: Harriet Fish
- Children: 3

Robert Fish (1812 – January 18, 1883) was known as the oldest and most successful of the 19th-century American yacht modelers and shipbuilders. He was well known for remodeling of the Sappho that won 3 successive international races.

== Early life ==
Fish was born in Front Street, New York City, in 1812. His father, David Fish, had a boathouse in New York City.

Robert Fish married Harriet Fish. They had 3 children, John Fish, Hattie Fish, and Evelyn Fish, born on 24 Jan 1869.

== Career ==
Fish started his career as a boatbuilder and opened a shop in Front Street and in 1840, moved to Water Street. In 1850, he started a shipyard at Pamrapo, New Jersey. The earliest boats he worked on were the yachts Annie and Julia. He built a yacht for the Duke of Wellington, one for the Prince of Wales Club, and another for Sir Francis Sykes, of England.

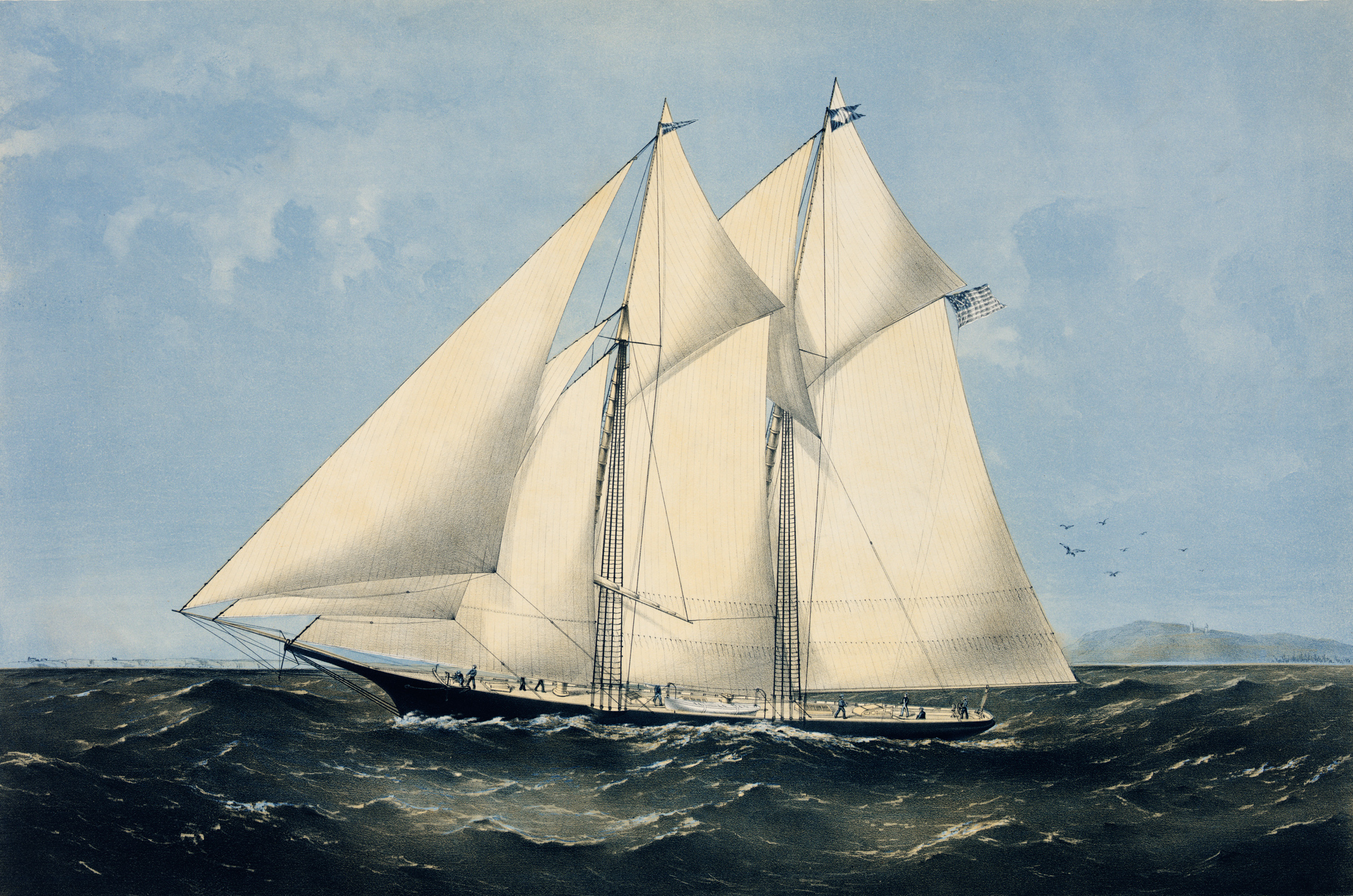
Sappho leaving Sandy Hook July 28, 1869, bound to Europe.

Fish was noted for the remodeling of the 300-ton schooner Sappho after several unsuccessful races. He modeled her by widening her hull so that the boat was able to hold up against stronger winds and sail faster. In 1870, he sailed her to England for her owner, W. P. Douglas, to help win 3 successive international races at Cowes, defeating the English yacht Cambria. He was the captain of the boat in these races.

Fish made the models for the yachts Truant, Challenge, Eva, Enchantress, and Meteor. He sold Challenge, Eva, and Enchantress to the yachtsman George L. Lorillard. From 1868 to 1873, he was listed as the captain of the schooner Challenge. On October 9, 1873, Enchantress was one of the boats that participated in the New York Ocean Regatta, which was a race from Owl's Head Point around the Cape May Lighthouse in New Jersey, and back to the Sandy Hook lightship. Enchantress won the cup valued at $1,000. Meteor made the fastest sailing time between Cowes and Lisbon.

On February 15, 1874, Fish left by the steamer Herman for Cowes where he took command of Enchantress owned by yachtsman Joseph F. Loubat of the New York Yacht Club. Fish was visiting England to see the improvements made in yacht designs.

== Death ==
Fish died on January 18, 1883, in Pamrapo at age 71. His funeral was at the Pamrapo Methodist Church and he was buried in the New York Bay Cemetery in New Jersey.

In April 1887, Loubat wrote a book about his races in Enchantress and dedicated it to the memory of the designer and sailing master, the late Robert Fish.

== See also ==
- List of sailboat designers and manufacturers
