= Thirteen Club =

American secret society founded in 1890

The Thirteen Club (13 Club) is a secret society at the College of William & Mary, founded in 1890, and noted for its philanthropic practices.

The original purpose of the organization is unclear, however by the 1920s it has become a less-secretive social club; in the 1920s, it was described as "an out-and-out drinking society" that hosted dinners and events. Invited guests and attendees at events were listed in the campus newspaper, The Flat Hat. Due to the lack of documentation about the organization, myths persist about the secret nature of society. One such myth is that membership was a closely guarded secret. This may be an exaggeration, as members of the Thirteen Club are identified in the 1939 yearbook and past members are identified in the Alumni Gazette.

In its current form, the Thirteen Club is a philanthropic group that "aims to promote connectivity and appreciation for the college experience." The identities of students who are currently active members of the group are not disclosed.

According to a William & Mary Libraries Special Collections description, the Thirteen Club was reactivated in 1994 and promotes anonymous acts benefiting the campus. A self-published website associated with the group describes its 'Be Here Now' campaign as encouraging students to value their college experience in the present.
