= The Oblong Box =

The Oblong Box may refer to:

- "The Oblong Box" (short story), an 1844 short story by Edgar Allan Poe
- The Oblong Box (film), a 1969 horror film starring Vincent Price
