= Earshot (poetry collection) =

1992 book of poems by Kimiko Hahn

Earshot is a book of poems by Kimiko Hahn, published in 1992 by Hanging Loose Press. It is Hahn's second poetry collection, after Air Pocket (1989). The book contains 46 poems. In 1993, Earshot received an Association of Asian America Studies Literature Award. In 1995, it was awarded the Theodore Roethke Memorial Poetry Prize.

== Contents ==
- The 168th Street Men's Shelter, 1987
- 30 Seconds On Fred Carter
- Afterbirth
- Another Daughter
- Brontosaurus
- The Calf
- Comp. Lit.: 1
- Comp. Lit.: 2
- Comp. Lit.: 3
- Comp. Lit.: 4
- Comp. Lit.: 5
- Comp. Lit.: 6
- Comp. Lit.: 7
- Comp. Lit.: 8
- Crossing Neptune Ave
- Cruise Missiles
- Day Lilies On The Second Anniversary Of My Second Marriage
- Decomposition
- Earshot
- Fist
- Foreclosure: A Series For J
- The Girl's First Language
- Going Inside To Write
- The Hawaiian Shirt
- The Heat
- The Hula Skirt, 1959
- Infrared
- Instead Of Speech
- The Izu Dancer
- The New Father
- The Older Child
- The Piano
- Poetic Closure
- Polar
- Removing A Diaphragm
- Revolutions
- The Room
- Seams
- Sense Memory
- Something
- Strands
- The Translator
- When I Heard The Red Pickup
- Whiskey For M
- The White Blouse
- The Yogurt
