= Foreign Bodies (poetry collection) =

2020 poetry collection by Kimiko Hahn

Foreign Bodies: Poems
- Author: Kimiko Hahn
- Publisher: W. W. Norton & Company
- Publication date: March 3, 2020
- ISBN: 978-1324005216
- Preceded by: Brain Fever
- Followed by: The Ghost Forest: New and Selected Poems

Foreign Bodies: Poems is a 2020 poetry collection by Kimiko Hahn, published by W. W. Norton & Company. It is Hahn's tenth book of poetry.

== Contents ==
Foreign Bodies: Poems is centered on objects and the possibilities of meaning that they pose to Hahn's speakers; some poems also address Hahn's family members like her deceased mother as well as more distant figures like artist Isamu Noguchi, an immigrant woman who fell from her apartment in Queens, or Dr. Chevalier Jackson, a medical expert who catalogued several items which children swallowed during the course of his career.

The book ends with an afterword, "Nitro: More on Japanese Poetics", which explains some of Hahn's present interests in poetry including but not limited to Japanese formalism, translation politics, and sound on the page. It also partly explains the purpose of Hahn writing about objects; objects, in Hahn's estimation, serve as sites "for the reader to experience odd shifts in awareness"—similar to Viktor Shklovsky's notion of defamiliarizing a stone in order to access its intrinsic "stone" quality.

Critics observed a current of grief through the book. In Harvard Review, Hahn stated that her father's health was declining in the preceding decades, during which Hahn and her sister encountered "his hoarding" and "his house full of stuff." Henceforth, Hahn had written more personal, object-oriented poems throughout the years, but she only realized their potential for a poetry collection after revising "Object Lessons" and "Cryptic Chamber" following the release of Brain Fever in 2014. In The Rumpus, Hahn shared:

The process of literally going into my father’s home and recovering some of those things or seeing what [my sister and I] could find was a process of recovery. Then the question arises: will I be able to recover from that experience? I think that writing some of the poems in Foreign Bodies was analogous to the process of going inside, going through this junk, finding something and, oh! A pencil. This is what I needed to write about.

== Critical reception ==
In a starred review, Publishers Weekly lauded Hahn's ability to render "familiar objects" sacred such as "junk drawer, purse, ... flash drive)?" The reviewer also appreciated Hahn's "artistic maturity" in how she wove together both English and Japanese poetics.

Alicia Wright, for Ploughshares, observed the "associations" within some of Hahn's poems, namely those which Hahn's speakers draw between certain objects in question and other entities of meaning. In her review's conclusion, Wright stated: "From within such intimacies of relation, embodied alternately in self, family, things, or memory itself, Kimiko Hahn’s Foreign Bodies delivers us an object lesson in the true reckoning still possible to us in poetry’s form."

Jonathan Russell Clark, writing for Vol 1. Brooklyn, pointed out the myriad of techniques and subjects within Hahn's realm as a poet. He wrote, "Hahn’s work, despite its esoteric interests, remains playful, engaging, and approachable. The connections that emerged from poem to poem—some foreshadowing forward, some harkening backward—are enough to keep your brain busy and happy for days. Hahn uses so many forms—from erasures to prose poems to the Japanese form tanka—and experiments with all of it."

For the Manchester Review, Ian Pople observed that "There is a strong, driving sense of personal narrative in the poems ... This is a first person who is almost fiercely committed to the narratives that create the trajectories of the poems in this book." Pople saw Hahn's objects as whimsical and exotic, providing a sense of occasion to the book's trajectory.

Alice Ostriker, in American Book Review, stated that "The book is whimsical. No, the book is serious. No, the book is serially and seriously whimsical, as a way (incidentally) of telling us a thing or two about our lives, about love and loss, and about language." Ostriker said that the multiplicity of the word "object"—both as a "material thing" but also "a lesson with a moral, a hope or purpose or intention" among others—was a crucial understanding of the book.

On the Seawall recommended the book in a poetry book round-up, stating that Hahn "is a master of form" who "weaves past and present, the personal and the historical, through a range of poetic forms drawn from multiple traditions, including Japanese poetics, erasure, cento, and quotation and citation from myriad sources that spark gorgeous juxtapositions."
