= John C. Colt =

American murderer

John Caldwell Colt
- Born: March 1, 1810; Hartford, Connecticut, United States
- Died: November 18, 1842 (aged 32); New York City
- Cause of death: Suicide
- Spouse: Caroline Henshaw
- Children: 1
- Conviction: Murder
- Penalty: Death

John Caldwell Colt (March 1, 1810 – November 18, 1842), the brother of Samuel Colt, was an American fur trader, bookkeeper, and law clerk. He served briefly as a U.S. Marine, forging a letter to get himself discharged after three months. After numerous business ventures, he became an authority concerning double-entry bookkeeping and published a textbook concerning the subject, which had 45 editions and remained in continuous publication until 13 years after his death.

In 1842, Colt was convicted of the murder of a printer named Samuel Adams, to whom Colt owed money for the publication of a bookkeeping textbook. Colt killed Adams with a hatchet the year previous to his arrest in what he claimed was self-defense, but he had afterwards concealed the crime by disposing of the body. When the body was discovered, Colt was the first suspect. The trial became a sensation in the New York news because of his family name, the manner of disposal of the corpse, and Colt's somewhat arrogant demeanor in the courtroom. Colt was found guilty and sentenced to hang, but killed himself on the morning of his execution.

Conspiracy theories circulated about the suicide, with some holding that Colt had in fact escaped from prison and staged a body to look like his own. One publication alleged that a family member smuggled the knife used in the suicide into his cell. Others stated that Colt was living in California with his wife, Caroline. None of these allegations were ever proven. Edgar Allan Poe may have based the short story "The Oblong Box" partly on the murder of Adams, and Herman Melville alluded to the case in his short story "Bartleby, the Scrivener".

== Early life ==
Colt coat of arms.

John Colt was born in Hartford, Connecticut. His father was Christopher Colt, a farmer who had relocated his family to Hartford when he changed professions and became a businessman. His mother was Sarah (née Caldwell), with whom Christopher had eight children. Two died during childhood; the eldest sister, Margaret, died of tuberculosis when John was 13 years old. John's brother Samuel Colt founded the Colt's Manufacturing Company.

When John was nine, his father sent him to Hopkins Academy; the next year, the father took him out again, partly because the boy was in constant trouble and partly because the father had lost his fortune in the Panic of 1819.

Colt's mother died of tuberculosis when he was age 11. He and his siblings were then cared for by their father's sister, Lucretia Colt Price, until Christopher remarried two years later to Olivia Sargeant.

Christopher had three more children with Olivia. As they now had financial difficulties, Olivia insisted that her stepchildren work rather than receive schooling. The Colt brothers' one surviving sister, Sarah Ann, acted as a surrogate mother of sorts until she was sent off to a relative's house to work as a menial. John was known to keep locks of hair belonging to her and Margaret all through his life.

At age 14, Colt started work as an assistant bookkeeper for the Union Manufacturing Company in Marlborough, Connecticut. He quit the job and moved to Albany, New York, in less than a year. He returned to Hartford during 1826 and studied at an academy for three months. During 1827, he found employment as a mathematics teacher at a ladies seminary in Baltimore, Maryland, for a year. During 1828, he became a supervisory engineer for a canal near Wilkes-Barre, Pennsylvania. The next year, his sister Sarah Ann killed herself by swallowing arsenic; one newspaper account stated it was due to a fight with her stepmother and another said she "took a morbid view of her doom to labor" until her "fortitude and her mind gave way". Devastated by this loss, John vowed to "leave the country and pass the rest of his days in some foreign land". In despair, he enlisted in the United States Marine Corps. His orders were for a Mediterranean cruise on the U.S.S. Constitution; illness prevented him from serving on the ship, and he worked as a clerk in Norfolk, Virginia, for a man referred to as Colonel Anderson.

Colt spent three months as a marine and was disillusioned with the military lifestyle; clerking in a humid port was not the adventurous life he had envisioned. He was still very ill, but not ill enough for a medical discharge, so he forged a letter in the name of George Hamilton, a farmer from Ware, Massachusetts, stating that his underage son had enlisted falsely with the name of John Colt. He mailed the letter to his brother James and asked him to mail it to Colonel Anderson from Ware. Anderson discharged Colt within days of receiving the letter, citing Colt's illness as the reason and not fraudulent enlistment.

Upon his discharge, Colt spent a year as a law clerk for his cousin Dudley Selden. At the same time, he became a riverboat gambler and was challenged to a duel concerning a shared mistress. Although the duel was never fought, this incident became part of Colt's reputation as a rough gambler. He traveled to Vermont during 1830 as a debate coach for the University of Vermont, at Burlington, Vermont; however, he quit after a year due to symptoms of tuberculosis. Colt then traveled to the Great Lakes region to recuperate and bought a farm in Michigan on Gooden's Lake; however, tubercular symptoms began again and he soon left for Cincinnati, Ohio, where he became a teacher of one of the first correspondence courses in America; he also became part of a group known for Bohemianism, and considered John Howard Payne and Hiram Powers among his friends.

He attempted many business ventures throughout the United States: land speculator in Texas, soap manufacturer in New York, grocery wholesaler in Georgia, fur trader, dry-goods merchant in Florida, and an organizer of Mardi Gras masquerade celebrations in New Orleans.

== Double-entry bookkeeping ==
While teaching in Louisville, Kentucky, during 1834, Colt began lecturing on "Italian Book-keeping", or double-entry bookkeeping. He toured the United States giving a series of lectures concerning the topic and by 1837 had begun writing a textbook concerning the subject.

His textbook The Italian science of double-entry book-keeping: simplified, arranged and methodized, received good reviews. Colt had the book published in Boston, New York City, Philadelphia, and Cincinnati, and by 1839 more than 200 schools were using it. Colt eliminated the word "Italian" from the title for the second edition and included transcripts of his lectures in the newer editions; the book had 45 printings and was in publication until 1855.

Soon after publishing the first edition of his textbook, Colt became partners with the publisher, Nathan G. Burgess, using the name Colt, Burgess & Co, in Cincinnati, Ohio. The new business almost became bankrupt after publishing An Introduction into the Origin of Antiquities in America by John Delafield Jr. The scholarship of the text was dubious, and the book was available by subscription only. Hoping for a better market for Delafield's book, Colt relocated to 14 Cortlandt Street in New York during 1839. The office doubled as Colt's residence, and Colt made his own shipping crates there.

== Murder of Samuel Adams ==
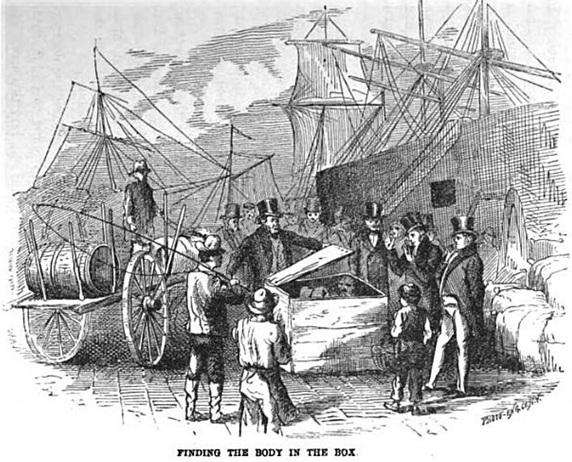
Authorities open the crate containing the body of Adams, – Sutton 1874.

On September 17, 1841, a New York printer named Samuel Adams went to meet Colt to collect a debt due for some textbooks that Adams had printed for him. The two disagreed about the final amount owed; sources indicate that it was a discrepancy of $1.35. According to Colt, Adams began choking him with his cravat. In self-defense, Colt reached for what he thought was a hammer to fend him off, but the weapon was actually a hatchet. Colt struck Adams four or five times with the weapon, causing Adams to drop to the floor.

Upon seeing that Adams was dead, Colt cleaned up the blood. The next morning (September 18), Colt placed the body into a large shipping crate and packed it with salt. He then addressed it to a non-existent address in New Orleans and hired a car-man named Barstow to deliver it to a ship named the Kalamazoo, scheduled to leave the next morning.

After a day or so, Adams' family began searching the city for him, publishing notices in several newspapers such as the New York Courier and Enquirer and the New York Weekly Tribune notifying people that he was missing. A neighbor of Colt's, Asa H. Wheeler, told Adams' father-in-law, Joseph Lane, that he had heard noises in Colt's office that sounded like a fight followed by a crash to the floor. Peering in the keyhole, he saw someone "bending over something on the floor". Wheeler later secured a key from the landlord and saw that a large packing crate was missing and that the floor had been scrubbed. On September 22, 1841, Colt visited Adams' print shop inquiring about the status of his books and the whereabouts of Adams. Adams' bookbinder, Charles Wells, told Colt that the last time Adams had been seen was on the way to visit Colt himself. Colt made no reply to the implied allegation, and excused himself.

Lane, Wheeler, and an employee of Adams named John Loud examined Adams' ledgers for any transactions involving Colt and went to the mayor of New York City, Robert Hunter Morris, with the evidence. Other witnesses said that Adams was last seen entering Colt's apartment on September 17 and that Colt had a crate delivered by a carman the next day. The mayor asked the Superintendent of Carts, William Godfrey, to locate the carman in question and determine the location of the crate. Godfrey found Barstow, who told him the parcel had been delivered to the freighter Kalamazoo.

The Kalamazoo was still in port, delayed from sailing by a storm. The New York police, accompanied by the city's mayor and the carman, boarded the ship and asked if the crate was still in the cargo hold. The decomposing body had already started emitting a strong odor, which ship hands had assumed was a poison put out to kill rats. The stevedore opened the crate, revealing a half-clothed male corpse wrapped in a shop awning, bound with rope and packed with salt. A scar on the body's leg and a single gold ring identified the body as Adams.

== Arrest and trial ==
Colt was arrested on September 23 by New York Police and the city's mayor. Adams' gold pocketwatch engraved with an image of the U.S. Capitol was found among his possessions. The trial began on January 13, 1842. Colt was represented by a team of three attorneys managed by his cousin Dudley Selden (for whom Colt had clerked), John Morrill and Robert Emmett. The three were paid in stock from Samuel Colt's new company: Patent Arms Manufacturing Company of Paterson, New Jersey. The Chief Prosecutor was James R. Whiting, district attorney for New York County. The presiding judge was William Kent.

=== Tried by the press ===
The Colt-Adams Murder trial dominated the popular press at the time and exceeded news of another New York murder, that of Mary Rogers. The press depicted Colt as a former professional riverboat gambler who had public affairs with women and a common-law wife and who committed perjury to enlist in and quit the Marines. Although the nature of the crime and the fact that Colt cohabited with an unmarried pregnant woman, Caroline Henshaw, added to the publicity, most of it was due to John Colt's relationship to Samuel Colt. Coverage appeared in New York papers such as The Sun, which incorrectly labeled a picture of P.T. Barnum purchased from the Albany Evening Atlas as a picture of Adams. Religious magazines such as The Catholic Herald, Evangelical Magazine, Episcopal Recorder and Gospel Advocate used the story to demonstrate such problems as the "lack of morality in the home".

Throughout the trial, Colt was repeatedly accused of "cold-blooded murder" by the New York press. The October 30 issue of the weekly Tribune quoted James Colt, then practicing law in St Louis as saying "insanity is hereditary in our family". James Gordon Bennett wrote lengthy editorials in the New York Herald about Colt's "confidence, assurance, and impudence" and that his "limitless potential has been undermined by a want of moral and religious culture". The major exception was The Knickerbocker in which Lewis Gaylord Clark reported the murder as a "misfortunate accident". Colt's lawyers continually petitioned Judge Kent to forbid press coverage, but Kent refused them by saying "The Court has done everything to prevent the jury from being influenced from without".

=== Murder weapon ===
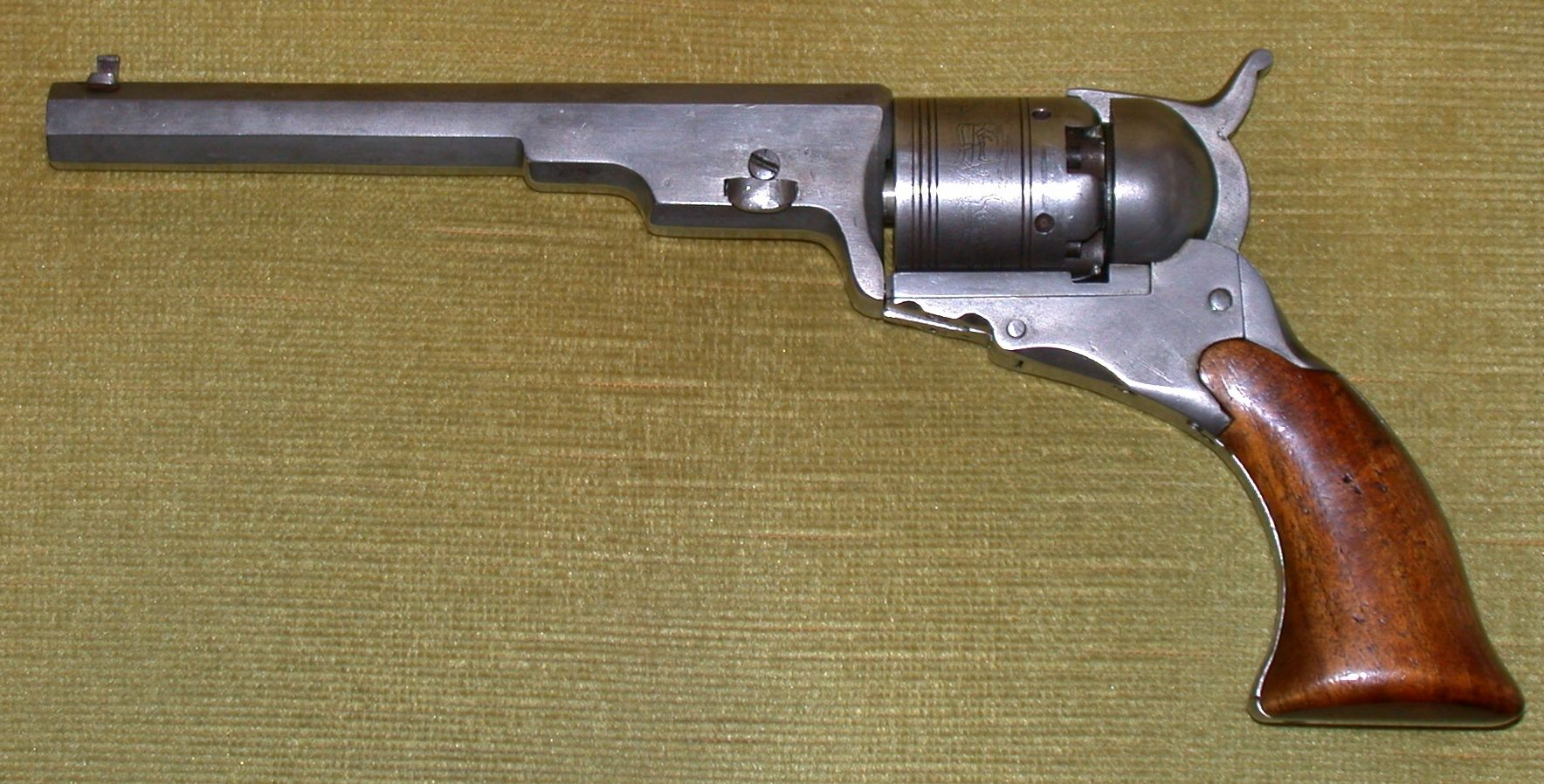
Colt was incorrectly believed to have used one of his brother's revolvers for Adams' murder.

Halfway through the trial, Whiting made allegations that Adams had been murdered with a Colt Paterson revolver rather than a hatchet. Whiting came to this conclusion after Doctor Gilman, who examined the body with the coroner, testified about a round hole in Adams' skull that could not have been made by the hatchet and suggested that Colt used a revolver in a premeditated act by which he lured Adams to his death. Although no witnesses had reported the sounds of gunfire, Whiting's argument was that a revolver ball fired by the power of the percussion cap alone could propel the ball with "enough force to kill a man", without making the noise of the exploding black powder in the cylinder. Several witnesses were called in to testify against this idea including an early ballistician named Zabrisky and Samuel Colt himself, who demonstrated to the court, by shooting his revolver in the courtroom and catching the fired balls in his hand, that such a shot could not penetrate to the depth of the wound found on Adams' skull.

Despite Selden's objections, Whiting had the coroner, David L. Rogers, bring Adams' skull and the hatchet into the courtroom to show the jury the direction and number of strikes made. John Colt was reported as "covering his face" at this demonstration. The cylindrical wound which Whiting and Gilman thought was made by a ball fired from a revolver was actually caused by one of the nails used by Colt to seal the crate. Gilman conceded that the wound was caused by a nail and admitted that no foreign object such as a ball from a revolver was found in the victim's head.

Colt admitted he had killed Adams and planned to confess before he was arrested. He attested that he acted in self-defense.

I then sat down, for I felt weak and sick. After sitting a few minutes, and seeing so much blood, I think I went and looked at poor Adams, who breathed quite loud for several minutes, then threw his arms out and was silent. I recollect at this time taking him by the hand, which seemed lifeless, and a horrid thrill came over me, that I had killed him. – John C. Colt

Colt reported that his first thought was to burn down the building to destroy the evidence, but as a number of people lived in the building, he reconsidered rather than "cause more carnage". He decided instead to dispose of the body in a large packing crate, and wrapped it in an awning and bound it with rope. After scrubbing the floor he threw Adams' clothing into a nearby outdoor privy, then stopped at the Washington bathhouse on Pearl Street to wash the blood from his clothes and hands.

=== Verdict ===
Closing arguments were made on January 23, 1842. Selden argued that Colt had acted in self-defense as Adams had been choking him and Colt's only means to defend himself was to grab a nearby weapon. His defense for hiding the body was temporary insanity. Whiting countered in a two-hour-long rebuttal that the killing was premeditated; he alluded to Colt's demeanor at the trial, the taking of Adams' watch, the leaving of a hatchet in plain view, and Colt's method of disposing of the body as evidence contradicting Colt's claim that his actions were that of an innocent man acting in self-defense. Judge Kent dismissed the argument for self-defense based on Colt's attempted concealment and instructed the jury that since Colt had confessed to the murder that they were to determine whether the charge should be murder or manslaughter. Kent remarked on Colt's "careless air" demonstrated throughout the trial in the courtroom and said his behavior was "not typical of an innocent man". The jury was disturbed by Colt's demeanor throughout the trial, agreeing with the judge that Colt appeared stoic, unremorseful and callous when describing his disposal of Adams' body. On January 24, after deliberating for over 10 hours, the jury found Colt guilty of willful murder.

Colt's team requested an appeal and argued the case on May 5, 1842, asking for a new trial as the jury at the previous was misinformed; on May 12 a new trial was denied and his lawyers appealed to the State Supreme Court located in Utica, New York. The State Supreme Court heard the case on July 16, 1842, and upheld the earlier court's decision. Colt's sentencing date was scheduled for September 27, 1842. Undaunted, Colt's lawyers recruited Rogers, the surgeon who performed Adams' autopsy, "to investigate the probable relative position and actions" of Colt and Adams during their struggle. By analyzing the number, shape, and position of the wounds and the blood splatter; Rogers deduced that the two "grappled face to face within a foot-and-a-half of each other" and "Adams was in an erect position at the time the fatal blows were inflicted". The report was submitted to Governor William H. Seward in the hope of securing a pardon for Colt. Seward was overwhelmed with requests asking for a pardon for Colt, including those from 36 lawyers who visited him personally in Albany as well as from judges and attorneys who knew Seward, such as Judge Ambrose Spencer and former Attorney General Willis Hall. Seward, in the end, would not pardon Colt, as he felt the attempted concealment of the crime and Colt's demeanor throughout the trial were not the actions of a "penitent man".

The prisoner has forgotten his victim, heaped insult upon his humble and bereaved family, defied the court, denounced the jury, and presented himself before the executive as an injured, not a penitent man. – William H. Seward

== Marriage and death ==
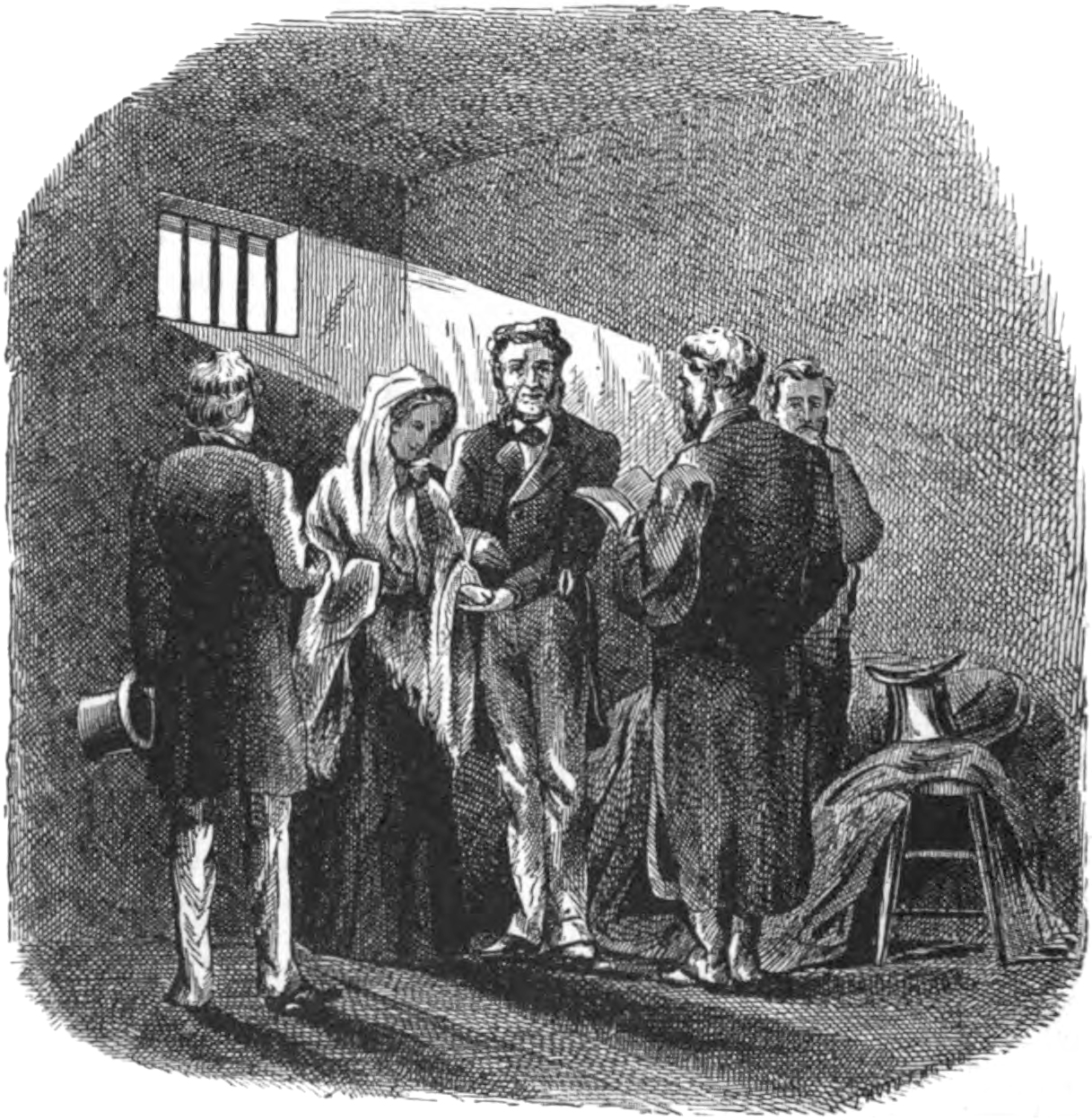
Depiction of Colt's wedding in prison from an 1874 text.

On September 28, 1842, after exhausting his final appeal, Colt was sentenced to death by hanging and remanded to New York City's infamous prison, the Tombs. His sentence was to be performed on November 14, 1842. Colt asked that he be allowed to marry Caroline Henshaw on the morning of his hanging. While imprisoned, Colt lived luxuriously in his prison cell, receiving daily visits from friends and family, smoking Cuban cigars, sleeping in an actual bed instead of a mound of straw and wearing silk dressing gowns inside and a seal skin overcoat for his daily walks in the prison yard. His cell contained the latest novels, a gilded bird cage with a canary and fresh flowers brought to him every day by Henshaw. He dined on meals from local hotels such as quail on toast, game pates, reed birds, and ortolans. Several attempts were made to remove him from the prison by dressing him in women's clothing but all these efforts were foiled. A doctor was hired who claimed he could resuscitate Colt from the hanging, providing the body did not remain suspended long, as he believed Colt's neck to be of such thickness that strangulation would be impossible. Colt's friends lodged the doctor in the Shakespeare Hotel on the morning of the scheduled hanging and planned to take the body there from the Tombs for resuscitation.

On the morning of November 14, 1842, Colt and Henshaw were married in the prison at a small ceremony conducted by Rev Henry Anthon, an Episcopal Minister, and witnessed by Samuel Colt and John Howard Payne. After the ceremony and a few hours before the scheduled execution, a fire began in the Tombs. After the fire was extinguished, Colt's body was found in his cell. He had stabbed himself in the heart with a clasp knife, believed to have been smuggled to him by a family member. His body was taken by Rev Anthon and buried in the churchyard of St. Mark's Church in-the-Bowery.

=== Aftermath ===
As the trial had made headlines in the daily newspapers, so did Colt's death. Theories were publicized that Colt had killed another prisoner and escaped during the fire. One newspaper account said that Colt had fled to California with his wife, as did a book published by a former New York Chief of Police. A man named Samuel M. Everett claimed he met John Colt (or a man who looked identical) in the Santa Clara Valley in California during 1852, and the account was published in Pearson's Magazine. Harold Schechter, a researcher and author of two books about John Colt dismisses this as "an outlandish tale" and a "product of folklore, not fact". An article in The New York Times written during 1880 said that Caroline Henshaw was watched by private detectives for years after Colt's death and that no sign was ever seen of him alive. None of these speculations of Colt's escape was proven to be true.

Colt historian William Edwards wrote that Caroline Henshaw married Samuel Colt in Scotland when Colt met her in Europe and that the son she bore was Samuel Colt's and not John Colt's. In a 1953 biography about Samuel Colt, based largely on family letters, Edwards wrote that John's marriage to Caroline was a way to legitimize her son Sammy. Samuel Colt had abandoned her because he felt she was not fit to be the wife of an industrialist and divorce was a social stigma at the time. Samuel Colt cared for the child named Samuel Caldwell Colt financially with a large allowance and paid for his tuition in what was described as "the finest private schools". In correspondence with and about his namesake, Samuel Colt referred to him as his "nephew" in quotes. Historians such as Edwards and Harold Schechter have said this was the elder Colt's way of letting the world know that the boy was his own son without saying so directly. After Samuel Colt's death during 1862, he left the boy $2 million by 2010 standards. Colt's widow, Elizabeth Jarvis Colt, and her brother contested this. In probate court, Caroline's son Sam produced a valid marriage license showing that Caroline and Samuel Colt were married in Scotland during 1838 and that this document made him a rightful heir to part of Colt's estate, if not to the Colt Manufacturing Company.

== References in literature ==
Author Herman Melville made an allusion to the case in his short story "Bartleby, the Scrivener". In this story, the narrator restrains his anger toward Bartleby, his unrelentingly difficult employee, by thinking upon "the tragedy of the unfortunate Adams and the still more unfortunate Colt and how poor Colt, being dreadfully incensed by Adams...was unawares hurled into his fatal act."

Edgar Allan Poe's "The Oblong Box", published during 1844, tells of the shipboard transport of a corpse in a wooden box packed with salt. The story may have been inspired by Colt's method of disposing of Adams' corpse, which Schecter calls "the single most macabre element of the Colt case."

== Bibliography ==
- Bunyan, Patrick (1999). All Around the Town: Amazing Manhattan Facts and Curiosities. Fordham University Press. p. 92. ISBN 978-0-8232-1941-4.
- Dunphy, Thomas; Cummins, Thomas J (1867), Remarkable trials of all countries, Diossy & Cockroft, pp. 226–310
- Edwards, William B. (1953). The Story of Colt"s Revolver: The Biography of Col. Samuel Colt. Harrisburg, PA: Stackpole Company.
- Houze, Herbert G.; Cooper, Carolyn C; Kornhauser, Elizabeth Mankin (2006), Carolyn C. Cooper; Elizabeth Mankin Kornhauser (eds.), Samuel Colt: arms, art, and invention, Yale University Press, p. 66, ISBN 978-0-300-11133-0, "Given the lurid details of the murder, which included John Colt's involvement with an attractive and very pregnant woman, the press coverage was immense."
- Lawson, John Davison, ed. (1914). "The Trial of John C. Colt for the Murder of Samuel Adams". American state trials: a collection of the important and interesting criminal trials which have taken place in the United States from the beginning of our government to the present day. Thomas Law Books.
- Schechter, Harold (2010). Killer Colt: Murder, Disgrace, and the Making of an American Legend. Random House. ISBN 978-0-345-47681-4.
- Tucher, Andie (1994). Froth and Scum: Truth, Beauty, Goodness, and the Ax Murder in America's First Mass Medium. The University of North Carolina Press. ISBN 978-0-8078-4472-4.
- Tucker, Barbara M.; Tucker, Kenneth H (2008), Industrializing antebellum America: the rise of manufacturing entrepreneurs in the early republic, Macmillan, ISBN 978-1-4039-8480-7
