= Sherod Santos =

American poet

- Born: September 9, 1948; South Carolina, United States
- Occupations: Poet, essayist, translator, playwright
- Writing career
- Notable works: The Burning World, Square Inch Hours, Greek Lyric Poetry: A New Translation
- Notable awards: Academy Award for Literary Excellence, Guggenheim Fellowship, Theodore Roethke Prize, Pushcart Prize

Sherod Santos (born September 9, 1948 in South Carolina) is an American poet, essayist, translator and playwright. He is the author of eight collections of poetry, most recentlyThe Burning World (Arrowsmith Press) in 2024, and Square Inch Hours (W.W. Norton) in 2017. Individual poems have appeared in The New Yorker,The Paris Review, The Nation, Poetry, Proscenium Theatre Journal, American Poetry Review, and The New York Times Book Review. His plays have been produced at The Algonquin Theatre in New York City, The Royal Court Theatre in London, The Side Project in Chicago, the Brooklyn International Theatre Festival, and the Flint Michigan Play Festival. Santos also wrote the settings for the Sappho poems in the CD Magus Insipiens, composed by Paul Sanchez and sung by soprano Kayleen Sanchez.

His many honors and awards include an Academy Award for Literary Excellence from the American Academy of Arts & Letters, a Guggenheim Fellowship, The Umhoefer Prize for Achievement in the Humanities, a National Endowment for the Arts Grant, the Theodore Roethke Memorial Prize. He was a finalist for The New Yorker Book Award in Poetry as well as The National Book Critics Circle Award and The National Book Award. From 1990 to 1998 he served as external examiner and poet-in-residence at the Poets' House outside Belfast, Northern Ireland.

He lives in Santa Fe, where he works with a hunger relief program serving the nine counties of Northern New Mexico.

== Honors and awards ==
- 2024 Selected for Best Literary Translations 2024
- 2006 Umhoefer Prize for Achievement in the Humanities for Greek Lyric Poetry: A New Translation
- 2002 Theodore Roethke Poetry Prize for The Pilot Star Elegies
- 2001 National Book Critics Circle Award for Criticism Finalist for A Poetry of Two Minds
- 2000 National Book Award Finalist
- 1999 Academy Award for Literary Excellence from the American Academy of Arts & Letters
- 1999 The New Yorker Book Award in Poetry Finalist
- 1998 Bernard F. Connors Prize for Poetry from the Paris Review for "Elegy for My Sister"
- 1987 National Endowment for the Arts fellowship
- 1995 British Arts Council International Travel Grant
- 1984 The Robert Frost Place poet in residence in Franconia, New Hampshire
- 1983 Delmore Schwartz Memorial Award
- 1983 Guggenheim Fellowship
- 1982 Ingram Merrill Foundation fellowship
- 1981 Oscar Blumenthal Prize from Poetry magazine
- 1980 Pushcart Prize in both poetry and the essay
- 1978 "Discovery"/The Nation Award

== Published works ==
Full-Length Poetry Collections

- The Burning World. Arrowsmith Press. 2024, ISBN 979-8-9863401-5-9
- Square Inch Hours. W. W. Norton & Company. 2017, ISBN 0393254984
- The Intricated Soul. W. W. Norton & Company. 2010. ISBN 978-0-393-07216-7.
- The Perishing. W. W. Norton & Company. 2004. ISBN 978-0-393-32576-8.
- The Pilot Star Elegies. W. W. Norton & Company. 2000. ISBN 978-0-393-32049-7.
- The City of Women. W. W. Norton & Company. 1994. ISBN 978-0-393-31175-4.
- The Southern Reaches. Wesleyan University Press. 1989.
- Accidental Weather. Doubleday & Company, Inc. 1982.

Essay Collections

- A Poetry of Two Minds. University of Georgia Press. 2000. ISBN 978-0-8203-2204-9.

Translations

- Greek Lyric Poetry: A New Translation. W. W. Norton & Company. 2005 ISBN 0-393-06056-X

Plays

- Follow the Leader. Produced at The Side Project, Chicago, IL, 2016.
- Lives of the Pigeons. Produced at The Side Project, Chicago, IL, 2013
- Star. Produced at Algonquin Theatre, New York City, 2010
- Coffee Shop. Produced as part of Flint Michigan Play Festival, 2010
