= Harold Schechter =

American true crime writer (born 1948)

- Born: June 28, 1948 (age 78)
- Education: City College of New York, State University of New York
- Occupations: True Crime Writer/Author, Professor Emeritus at Queens College, CUNY.
- Spouse: Kimiko Hahn
- Children: 2, including Lauren Oliver
- Writing career
- Genres: True crime, fiction
- Subjects: Serial killers, popular culture
- Website: haroldschechter.com

Harold Schechter (born June 28, 1948) is an American true crime writer who specializes in serial killers. He is a Professor Emeritus at Queens College, City University of New York where he taught classes in American literature and myth criticism for forty-two years. Schechter's essays have appeared in numerous publications including The New York Times, The Wall Street Journal, The Los Angeles Times, and the International Herald Tribune. He is the editor of the Library of America volume, True Crime: An American Anthology. His newest book, published in September 2025, is 50 States of Murder: An Atlas of American Crime.

== Education ==
Schechter attended the State University of New York at Buffalo where his PhD director was Leslie Fiedler. He is also a 1969 graduate of City College of New York.

== Career ==
Schechter is Professor Emeritus at Queens College, and specializes in American true crime, specifically serial murders of the 19th and early 20th centuries. Using primary sources such as newspaper clippings and court records, he supplies thorough documentation of every case he profiles, while still managing to create compelling narratives and fully fleshed-out characters.

His 2014 book, The Mad Sculptor: The Maniac, the Model, and the Crime that Shook the Nation, was nominated for an Edgar Award in the Best Fact Crime category. In addition to his work as a crime historian, Schechter is the author of an acclaimed series of detective novels based on the works of Edgar Allan Poe. Under the pseudonym H. C. Chester, he has also co-written the middle-grade trilogy, Curiosity House, with his daughter, bestselling YA novelist Lauren Oliver. The first book in the series, Curiosity House: The Shrunken Head (2016), was nominated for an Edgar Award in the "Best Juvenile Mystery" category.

In addition to his historical crime books and mystery fiction, Schechter has written extensively on American popular culture. In The Bosom Serpent: Folklore and Popular Art, he explores the relationship between contemporary commercial entertainment and the narrative archetypes of traditional folklore. Savage Pastimes: A Cultural History of Violent Entertainment places the current controversy over media violence in a broad historical context. Examining everything from Victorian murder ballads to the productions of the nineteenth-century Grand Guignol, the book makes the somewhat contrarian argument that today's popular entertainment is actually less violent than the gruesome diversions of the supposedly halcyon past.

In his 1973 article, "Kali on Main Street: The Rise of the Terrible Mother in America", Schechter uses the phrase "horror-porn," which is cited by the Oxford English Dictionary as the first printed appearance of the word "porn" in its now-common figurative meaning: "As the second element in compounds: denoting written or visual material that emphasizes the sensuous or sensational aspects of a non-sexual subject, appealing to its audience in a manner likened to the titillating effect of pornography.

With David Black, Schechter also co-wrote the teleplay for the Season 8 Law & Order episode, “Castoff.”

== Praise ==
Publishers Weekly has called Schechter a "serial killer expert", a "deft writer", praising his ability to recreate "from documentation the thoughts and perspectives of long-dead figures." PW called Schechter's book The Devil's Gentleman "a riveting tale of murder, seduction and tabloid journalism run rampant in New York not so different from today".

Booklist called his book Depraved a "first-rate true crime and first-rate popular history." Writing in the New York Times reviewer James Polk praised Nevermore, the first in Schechter's Poe mystery series, for its "entertaining premise . . . supported by rich period atmospherics."

== Personal life ==
Schechter is married to poet Kimiko Hahn. He has two daughters from a previous marriage: the writer Lauren Oliver, and professor of philosophy Elizabeth Schechter.

== Bibliography ==
=== True crime ===
- Deranged: The Shocking True Story of America's Most Fiendish Killer!, the story of New York serial murderer Albert Fish. Pocket Books, (1998).
- Deviant: The Shocking True Story of the Original "Psycho", the story of Ed Gein, the killer who inspired Psycho, The Texas Chain Saw Massacre and The Silence of the Lambs, Pocket Books, (1998).
- Fiend: The Shocking True Story of America's Youngest Serial Killer, the story of Jesse Pomeroy, child murderer. Pocket Books, (2000).
- Panzram: A Journal of Murder (Introduction) Amok Books, (2002).
- Fatal: The Poisonous Life of a Female Serial Killer, the story of 19th century murderess Jane Toppan. Pocket Star, (2003).
- The Serial Killer Files: The Who, What, Where, How, and Why of the World's Most Terrifying Murderers (2003). Ballantine Books.
- A to Z Encyclopedia of Serial Killers (co-written with David Everitt) Gallery Books (2006).
- The Devil's Gentleman: Privilege, Poison, and the Trial that Ushered in the Twentieth Century, New York: Random House/Ballantine Books, (2007).
- True Crime: An American Anthology (Editor) Library of America, (2008).
- Depraved: The Shocking True Story of America's First Serial Killer, retitled in later releases as Depraved: The Definitive True Story of H. H. Holmes, Whose Grotesque Crimes Shattered Turn-of-the-Century Chicago, the story of Chicago serial murderer Herman Mudgett, alias Dr. H. H. Holmes Pocket Books (reprint, 2008).
- Bestial: The Savage Trail of a True American Monster, serial murderer Earle Leonard Nelson, who killed in Canada and the United States. Pocket Books, (2008).
- Killer Colt: Murder, Disgrace, and the Making of an American Legend (2010), the story of 19th century murderer John C. Colt, brother of arms maker Samuel Colt, and the trial. Ballantine Books, (2010).
- Masters of True Crime: Chilling Stories of Murder and the Macabre (contributed an essay), Edited by R. Barri Flowers, Prometheus Books, (2012).
- Psycho USA: Famous American Killers You Never Heard Of Ballantine Books, (2012)
- The Mad Sculptor: The Maniac, the Model, and the Murder That Shook the Nation, the story of Roger Irwin's obsession with the sister of model Veronica Gedeon and his subsequent descent into madness. New Harvest, (2014)
- Man-Eater: The Life and Legend of an American Cannibal, New York: Little A (2015).
- Hell's Princess: The Mystery of Belle Gunness, Butcher of Men , the story of Belle Gunness a Norwegian immigrant who murdered at least 14 people primarily bachelors, most notably on a farm in La Porte, Indiana between 1902 and 1908. New York: Little A (2018).
- Panic (Bloodlands Collection) A short historical narrative about a series of child murders during the Depression. Amazon Original Stories, (2018).
- Rampage (Bloodlands Collection) A short historical narrative about Howard Unruh. Amazon Original Stories, (2018).
- The Pied Piper (Bloodlands Collection) A short historical narrative about Charlie Schmid. Amazon Original Stories, (2018).
- The Brick Slayer (Bloodlands Collection) A short historical narrative about Robert Nixon, whose story inspired Richard Wright's Native Son. Amazon Original Stories, (2018).
- Little Slaughterhouse on the Prairie (Bloodlands Collection) A short historical narrative about The murderous Bender Family. Amazon Original Stories, (2018).
- The Pirate (Bloodlands Collection) A short historical narrative about Albert W. Hicks. Amazon Original Stories, (2018).
- Ripped From the Headlines: The Shocking True Stories Behind the Movies' Most Memorable Crimes, New York: Little A. (2020)
- Maniac: The Bath School Disaster and the Birth of the Modern Mass Killer, New York: Little A. (2021)
- Did You Hear What Eddie Gein Done?, with Eric Powell, Albatross Funny Books. (2021)
- Murderabilia: A History of Crime in 100 Objects, Workman Publishing Company. (2023)
- 50 States of Murder: An Atlas of American Crime, Workman Publishing Company. (2025)

=== Mystery ===
- Outcry, Pocket Books, (1996) – A Novel based on the fictional son of Ed Gein, and his path of destruction.
- Nevermore (1999) – Edgar Allan Poe joins Davy Crockett to solve a series of shocking murders in Baltimore in 1835. Pocket Books, 2000.
- The Hum Bug (2001) – Poe teams with Showman PT Barnum to solve a series of murders in New York. Pocket Books.
- Mask of the Red Death (2004) – Poe joins forces with Kit Carson to track down a liver-eating murderer. Like the previous book, this one also takes place in New York.
- The Tell-Tale Corpse (2006) – Poe works with author Louisa May Alcott to put down yet another murderer. This time, he takes his mystery to Massachusetts.

=== Popular culture ===
- Patterns in Popular Culture: A Sourcebook for Writers, New York: Harper & Row, (1980).
- Film Tricks: Special Effects in the Movies, with David Everitt, New York: H. Quist, (1980).
- The Manly Handbook, with David Everitt, Berkley Trade, (1982).
- Kidvid: A Parents' Guide to Children's Videos, Pocket Books (1986).
- Start Collecting Comic Books Diane Pub (1990).
- The Manly Movie Guide: Virile Video & Two-Fisted Cinema, Berkley Trade, (1997).
- American Voices: A Thematic/Rhetorical Reader with Warren Rosenberg and Jonna Gormely Semeiks. Harper Collins College (1998).
- Real to Reel with David Everitt. Berkley Trade (2000).
- Savage Pastimes: A Cultural History of Violent Entertainment, St. Martin's Press, (2005).
- The Whole Death Catalog: A Lively Guide to the Bitter End, Ballantine Books, (2009).

=== Academic works ===
- New Gods: Psyche and Symbol in Popular Art, Madison, WI: University of Wisconsin Press, (1980).
- Discoveries: Fifty Stories of the Quest, edited with Jonna Gormely Semeiks, Oxford University Press, (1992).
- Original Sin: The Visionary Art of Joe Coleman, essay. New York: Heck Editions, (1997).
- The Bosom Serpent: Folklore and Popular Art, Peter Lang Publishing, (1998).
- Conversation Pieces: Poems that Talk to Other Poems, editor with Kurt Brown, New York: Knopf/Everyman, (2007).
- Killer Verse: Poems of Murder and Mayhem, editor with Kurt Brown, New York: Knopf/Everyman, (2011).
- Reel Verse: Poems About the Movies, editor with Michael Walters, New York: Everyman's Library/Penguin, (2019).

=== As H. C. Chester, with Lauren Oliver ===
- Curiosity House #1: The Shrunken Head, New York: HarperCollins Publishers, 2015.
- Curiosity House #1: The Screaming Statue, New York: HarperCollins Publishers, 2017.
- Curiosity House #3: The Fearsome Firebird, New York: HarperCollins Publishers, 2021.
