= Kimiko Hahn =

American poet

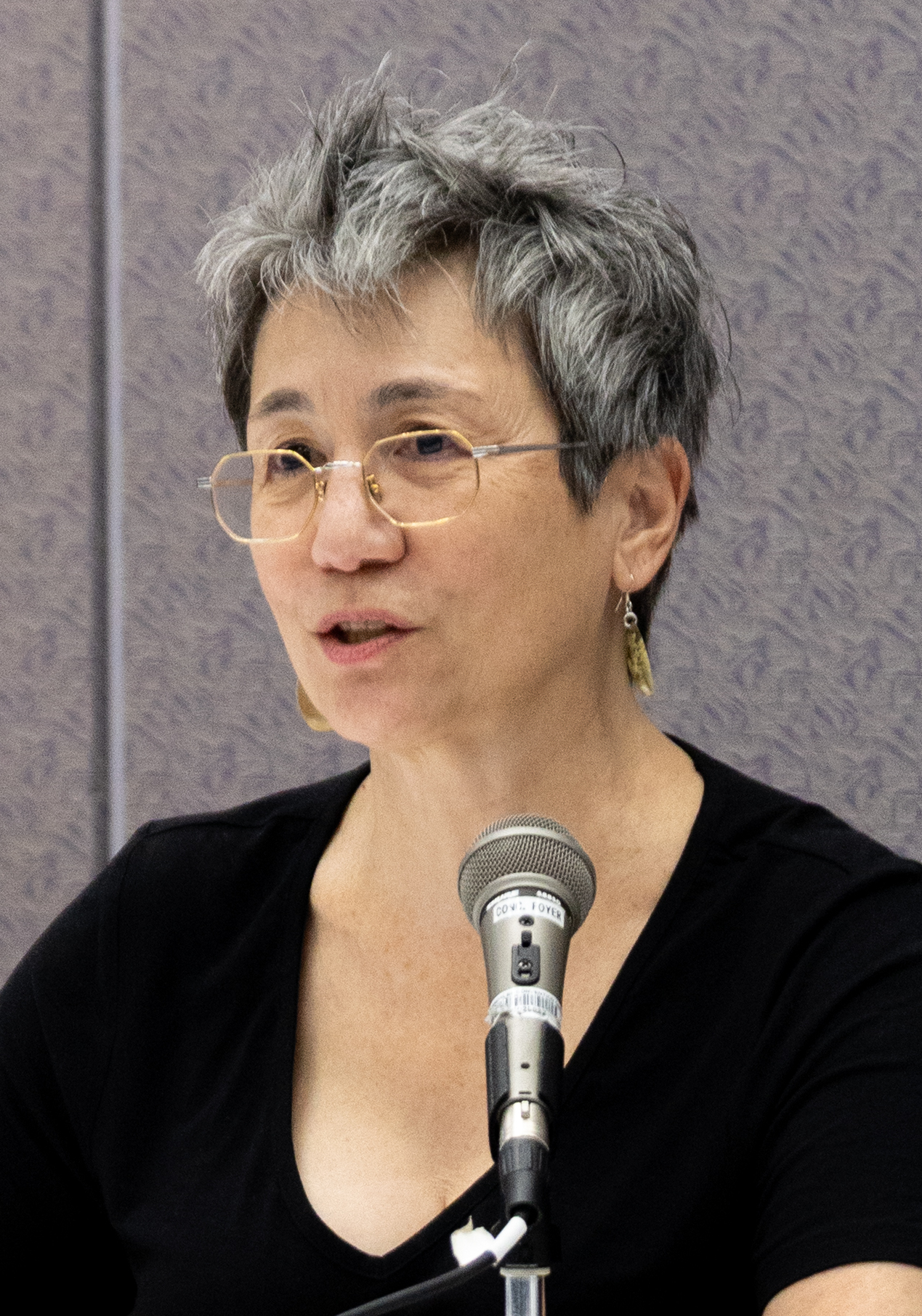
- Hahn at AWP 2025
- Born: July 5, 1955 (age 71); Mount Kisco, New York
- Occupation: Poet
- Spouse(s): Ted Hannan; Harold Schechter
- Children: 2
- Writing career
- Genre: Poetry
- Notable works: Toxic Flora (2010),The Narrow Road to the Interior (2006), The Artist's Daughter (2002) Mosquito and Ant (1999), The Unbearable Heart (1995), Earshot (1992)
- Notable awards: Ruth Lilly Poetry Prize; American Book Award; PEN/Voelcker Award

Kimiko Hahn (born July 5, 1955) is an American poet and distinguished professor in the MFA program of Queens College, CUNY. Her works frequently deal with the reinvention of poetic forms and the intersecting of conflicting identities.

In 2025, The New York State Writers Institute announced that Kimiko Hahn was named New York State Poet and would serve a two-year term as Poet Laureate.

== Biography ==
Hahn was born in Mount Kisco, New York, on July 5, 1955. Her parents are both artists. Her mother, Maude Miyako Hamai, was a Japanese American from Maui, Hawaii; her father, Walter Hahn, was a German American from Wisconsin. They met in Chicago, where Walter was a friend of the notable African American author Ralph Ellison. Her sister is Tomie Hahn, a performer and ethnologist.

Hahn grew up in Pleasantville, New York, and between 1964 and 1965, the Hahns later lived in Tokyo, Japan. As a teen, she became involved in the New York City Asian American movement of the 1970s. Zhou Xiaojing has commented that her racially mixed background influenced "her profound understanding of the politics of the body" as seen in her poetry (113). In the U.S., her Asian appearance made some schoolmates "called her Chinese or Japanese, never regarding her as an American like them. Yet when she went to Japan … her schoolmates [there] called her American or 'gaijin'" (113).

Hahn received a bachelor's degree in English and East Asian Studies from the University of Iowa and an M.A. in Japanese Literature from Columbia University. She is a distinguished professor at Queens College, CUNY and has also taught at New York University, Sarah Lawrence College, and University of Houston.

Hahn has two daughters, Miyako Tess (b. 1987) and Reiko Lily (b. 1990), from her second marriage to Ted Hannan. She has been married to true crime writer Harold Schechter since 2002.

== Poetry works ==
The major themes of Hahn's poetry explores Asian American female desire and subjectivity. The judges' citation from the Pen/Voelcker Award noted: "With wild courage Kimiko Hahn's poems voyage fearlessly into explorations of love, sexuality, motherhood, violence, and grief and the way gender inscribes us."

Her poetry draws from feminist works of Hélène Cixous, Luce Irigaray, and Adrienne Rich, more canonical American poets such as T.S. Eliot and William Carlos Williams poetic experimentations, as well as Japanese culture and literature. The title of The Narrow Road to the Interior (W.W. Norton, 2006), for instance, is drawn from Bashō's Oku no Hosomichi. In an interview with Laurie Sheck for Bomb, Hahn discussed how she combines a variety of genres in her work, including Japanese forms, such as zuihitsu in her poetry collection, The Narrow Road to the Interior: "The Japanese view [zuihitsu] as a distinct genre, although its elements are difficult to pin down. There's no Western equivalent, though some people might wish to categorize it as a prose poem or an essay. You mentioned some of its characteristics: a kind of randomness that is not really random, but a feeling of randomness; a pointed subjectivity that we don't normally associate with the essay. The zuihitsu can also resemble other Western forms: lists, journals. I've added emails to the mix. Fake emails....The technique of collage is really compelling to me. Letter writing, diary form—real and invented—I like to use within the zuihitsu itself."

Her poems were first published in We Stand Our Ground: Three Women, Their Vision, Their Poems, which she co-created with Gale Jackson and Susan Sherman. Since then, she has authored multiple collections of poetry, including Toxic Flora (2010), The Narrow Road to the Interior (2006), The Artist's Daughter (2002), Mosquito and Ant (1999), Volatile (1998), The Unbearable Heart (1995), and Earshot (1992).

The latter, Earshot, received the Theodore Roethke Memorial Poetry Prize and an Association of Asian American Studies Literature Award. In 1996, her poem "Possession: A Zuihitsu" (originally published in Another Chicago Magazine) was included in the anthology the Best American Poetry, and The Unbearable Heart received an American Book Award. Other honors for her work include the Lila Wallace–Reader's Digest Writer's Award, the Shelley Memorial Prize, and the PEN/Voelcker Award. In 2023, Hahn received the Ruth Lilly Poetry Prize for lifetime achievement. She has received fellowships from the National Endowment for the Arts, Guggenheim Foundation, and the New York Foundation for the Arts.

Aside from poetry, Hahn has written for film such as the 1995 two-hour HBO special, Ain't Nuthin' But a She-Thing (for which she also recorded the voice-overs); and most recently, a text for Everywhere at Once, Holly Fisher's film based on Peter Lindbergh's still photos and narrated by Jeanne Moreau. The latter premiered at the 2007 Cannes Film Festival and presented at the 2008 Tribeca Film Festival.

== Bibliography ==
=== Poetry ===
- Air Pocket. Hanging Loose Press, 1989. ISBN 978-0914610526
- Earshot. Hanging Loose Press, 1992. ISBN 978-0914610847
- The Unbearable Heart. Kaya Press, 1995. ISBN 978-1885030016
- The Unbearable Heart. New York Kaya. 1997.
- Volatile. Hanging Loose Press, 1999. ISBN 978-1882413577
- Pine. 1999
- Mosquito and Ant: Poems. W.W. Norton, 1999. ISBN 978-0393047325
- The Artist's Daughter: Poems W.W. Norton, 2002. ISBN 978-0393051025
- The Narrow Road to the Interior: Poems. W.W. Norton, 2006. ISBN 978-0393061895
- "A Field Guide to the Intractable: Zuihitsu." Small Anchor Press chapbook, 2009.
- Toxic Flora: Poems. W.W. Norton, 2010. ISBN 0-393-07662-8 ISBN 978-0393076622
- Boxes with Respect. Center for Book Arts. 2011.
- The Cryptic Chamber. Epiphany Editions. 2013.
- Brain Fever: Poems. W.W. Norton, 2014. ISBN 978-0-393-24335-2
- (Write It!) Wells College Press, 2019.
- Foreign Bodies: Poems. W. W. Norton, 2020. ISBN 978-1-324-00521-6
- The Ghost Forest: New and Selected Poems. W. W. Norton, 2024. ISBN 978-1324086062

Selected broadsides

- Walt Whitman Circle. 2015.
- 3/3: Volume 1, Issue 1. with Lauren Henken. 2013.

With Gale Jackson and Susan Sherman

- We Stand Our Ground: Three Women, Their Vision, Their Poems. Ikon, Inc., 1988. ISBN 978-0945368014

=== Prose ===
- "Memory, Language, and Desire." Asian Americans: Collages of Identities: Proceedings of Cornell Symposium of Asian America, Issues of Identity. Ed. Lee C. Lee. Cornell University Press, 1992. 64–69. OCLC 34909762
- "Afterbirth." Charlie Chan Is Dead: An Anthology of Contemporary Asian American Fiction. Ed. and intro. Jessica Hagedorn. Penguin Books, 1993. ISBN 9780140231113

=== Interviews ===
- "Kimiko Hahn: Expressing Self and Desire, Even If One Must Writhe." By Eileen Tabios. Black Lightning: Poetry-In-Progress. New York: Asian American Writers' Workshop. 1998. ISBN 9781889876061
- "Kimiko Hahn." By Laurie Sheck. Bomb 96 (Summer 2006)

== Awards ==
- Ruth Lilly Poetry Prize
- 1996 American Book Award
- 2008 PEN/Voelcker Award for Poetry
- Association of Asian America Studies Literature Award
- Lila Wallace-Reader's Digest Award
- Theodore Roethke Memorial Poetry Prize
- Shelley Memorial Award from the Poetry Society of America
- The National Endowment for the Arts fellowships
- N.Y. Foundation for the Arts fellowships
- 2010 Guggenheim Fellow

== See also ==
- List of Asian American writers

== Critical studies ==
1. Kimiko Hahn's 'Interlingual Poetics' in Mosquito and Ant By: Grotjohn, Robert. pp. 219–34 IN: Lim, Shirley Geok-lin (ed.); Gamber, John Blair (ed.); Sohn, Stephen Hong (ed.); Valentino, Gina (ed.); Transnational Asian American Literature: Sites and Transits. Philadelphia, PA: Temple UP; 2006. viii, 306 pp. (book article)
2. Two Hat Softeners 'In the Trade Confession': John Yau and Kimiko Hahn By: Zhou, Xiaojing. pp. 168–89 IN: Zhou, Xiaojing (ed. and introd.); Najmi, Samina (ed.); Form and Transformation in Asian American Literature. Seattle, WA: U of Washington P; 2005. 296 pp. (book article)
3. 'I Cannot Find Her': The Oriental Feminine, Racial Melancholia, and Kimiko Hahn's The Unbearable Heart By: Chang, Juliana; Meridians: Feminism, Race, Transnationalism, 2004; 4 (2): 239–60. (journal article)
4. Mixing Aesthetics. A Poet's Cityscape: Kimiko Hahn By: Schlote, Christiane. pp. 541–59 IN: Alonso Gallo, Laura P. (ed. and introd.); Voces de América/American Voices: Entrevistas a escritores americanos/Interviews with American Writers. Cádiz, Spain: Aduana Vieja; 2004. 730 pp. (book article)
5. Pulse and Impulse: The Zuihitsu By: Hahn, Kimiko. pp. 75–82 IN: Dienstfrey, Patricia (ed.); Hillman, Brenda (ed.); DuPlessis, Rachel Blau (foreword); The Grand Permission: New Writings on Poetics and Motherhood. Middletown, CT: Wesleyan UP; 2003. xxvi, 278 pp. (book article)
6. Luce Irigaray's Choreography with Sex and Race By: Mori, Kaori; Dissertation Abstracts International, Section A: The Humanities and Social Sciences, 2002 July; 63 (1): 189. State U of New York, Buffalo, 2002. (dissertation abstract)
7. To Adore a Fragment: An Interview with Kimiko Hahn By: Kalamaras, George; Bloomsbury Review, 1999 Mar-Apr; 19 (2): 13-14. (journal article)
8. Breaking from Tradition: Experimental Poems by Four Contemporary Asian American Women Poets By: Xiaojing, Zhou; Revista Canaria de Estudios Ingleses, 1998 Nov; 37: 199-218. (journal article)
9. Huang, Guiyou and Emmanuel Sampath Nelson, eds. Asian-American Poets: A Bio-Bibliographical Critical Sourcebook. Greenwood Publishing Group. 2002. 113-9. ISBN 9780313318092
10. Hara, Marie and Nora Okja Keller, eds. Intersecting Circles: The Voices of Hapa Women in Poetry and Prose. Baboo Ridge Press, 1999 ISBN 978-0910043595
11. Wallinger-Schorn, Brigitte."Appendix: Interviews: Interviews with Kimiko Hahn." "So There it Is": An Exploration of Cultural Hybridity in Contemporary Asian American Poetry. Rodopi, 2011. 249-291. ISBN 978-9042034143
