= Earle Nelson =

American serial killer (1897–1928)

- Nelson in 1927
- Born: Earle Leonard Ferral; May 12, 1897; San Francisco, California, U.S.
- Died: January 13, 1928 (aged 30); Vaughan Street Jail, Winnipeg, Manitoba, Canada
- Cause of death: Execution by hanging
- Other names: The Dark Strangler; The Gorilla Man; Charles Harrison; Adrian Harris; Virgil Wilson
- Spouse: Mary Martin (m. 1919; sep. 1920)
- Convictions: Murder; Attempted molestation; Breaking and entering
- Penalty: Death

Details
- Victims: 22–29
- Span of crimes: February 20, 1926 – June 9, 1927
- Country: United States and Canada
- States: California; Oregon; Washington; Iowa; Missouri; Pennsylvania; New York; Michigan; Illinois; Manitoba
- Date apprehended: June 16, 1927

Earle Leonard Nelson (né Ferral; May 12, 1897 – January 13, 1928), also known as the Gorilla Man, the Gorilla Killer, and the Dark Strangler, was an American serial killer, rapist, and necrophile who killed at least twenty women in various U.S. states and two in Canada between 1926 and 1927. He is perhaps the first known serial sex murderer of the twentieth century.

Born and raised in San Francisco, California, by his devoutly Pentecostal grandmother, Nelson exhibited bizarre behavior as a child, which was compounded by head injuries he sustained in a bicycling accident at age 10. After committing various minor offenses in early adulthood, he was institutionalized in Napa several times before his final discharge in 1925.

Nelson began committing numerous rapes and murders in February 1926, primarily in the West Coast cities of San Francisco and Portland, Oregon. In late 1926 he moved east, committing multiple rapes and murders in several Midwestern and East Coast cities before moving north into Canada, raping and killing a teenage girl in Winnipeg, Manitoba. After committing his second murder in Winnipeg, he was arrested by Canadian authorities, convicted of his final murder only—‌that of Emily Patterson—‌and sentenced to death. Nelson was executed by hanging in Winnipeg in 1928.

In undertaking his crimes, Nelson had a modus operandi: Most of his victims were middle-aged landladies, many of whom he would find through "room for rent" advertisements. Posing as a mild-mannered and charming Christian drifter, Nelson used the pretext of renting a room in the landladies' boarding houses to make contact with them before attacking. Each of his victims were killed via strangulation, and many were raped after death. His penultimate victim, a 14-year-old girl named Lola Cowan, was one of three victims to be significantly mutilated after death.

At the time, Nelson's confirmed victim count of twenty-two was the largest number of murders attributed to one person in United States history. The crimes committed by Nelson were a source of inspiration for Alfred Hitchcock's 1943 film Shadow of a Doubt.

== Early life ==
Earle Nelson was born Earle Leonard Ferral on May 12, 1897, in San Francisco, California, the son of an Iowa-born mother of Danish and Irish descent, Frances Nelson, and a father whose ancestry was Jewish, James Carlos Ferral. Both of his parents died of syphilis before he reached two years of age. Nelson was subsequently sent to live with his maternal grandmother Jennie Nelson, a devout Pentecostal who raised him alongside her two younger children, Willis and Lillian, who were ten and eight years his senior, respectively. Nelson exhibited self-loathing and other "morbid" behavior at a young age, and was expelled from the Agassiz primary school in San Francisco at age 7. Around age 10, he collided with a streetcar while riding his bicycle and remained unconscious for six days. After he awoke, Nelson's behavior became erratic, and he suffered from frequent headaches and memory loss.

Described as a "psychotic prodigy," Nelson exhibited increasingly bizarre, manic behaviors in his childhood, such as talking to imaginary people, compulsively quoting Biblical passages, and watching female family members undress. His grandmother noted occasions where Nelson would go to school in freshly-cleaned clothes and return home in rags, as though he had exchanged clothes with a homeless person. Nelson's strong religious upbringing remained a pervasive influence in his life, and he obsessively read the Book of Revelation as a teenager.

In his early teenage years, Nelson began frequenting brothels and bars in San Francisco's Barbary Coast red-light district, and contracted a venereal disease. As he progressed through puberty, Nelson grew into a stocky, physically fit young man. He would sometimes entertain his family with his physical talents, such as walking on his hands or lifting heavy objects with his teeth.

== Crimes ==
=== Early offenses; institutionalization ===
Nelson began his criminal activities at a young age, and was sentenced to two years in San Quentin State Prison in 1915 after breaking into a cabin in rural Plumas County, which he believed had been abandoned. He was paroled for this offense on September 6, 1916, but was arrested again in Stockton on March 9, 1917, for petty larceny. Nelson spent another six months incarcerated before being discharged, after which he was arrested in Los Angeles on burglary charges. After spending approximately five months in Los Angeles County Jail, Nelson escaped.

Sometime in late-1917, Nelson enlisted in the U.S. military, but deserted after six weeks. He repeated this pattern on several occasions, enlisting in different military branches under different names before deserting. In 1918, Nelson was committed to the Napa State Mental Hospital after behaving oddly and erratically during one of his brief stints in the United States Navy. A Navy psychologist noted that Nelson was "living in a constitutional psychotic state."

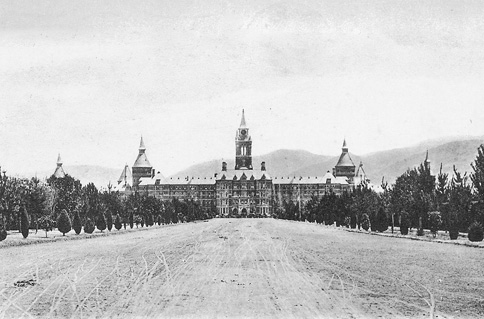
Napa State Mental Hospital, where Nelson was institutionalized on multiple occasions

Upon his arrival at Napa State Mental Hospital, a psychologist who observed Nelson on May 21, 1918, noted that he did not appear "violent, homicidal, or destructive." William Pritchard, a psychiatrist who conducted a preliminary interview with him, noted that Nelson spoke of hallucinations and other paranoid delusions: "He has seen faces, heard music, and at times believed people were poisoning him. Voices sometimes whisper to him to kill himself. Says that if he were kept in jail, he would get something sharp and cut the veins in his wrists." Pritchard also indicated that Nelson had experienced occipital headaches, fainted several times, and felt dizzy during their interactions.

During his institutionalization, Nelson managed to escape at least three times before staff eventually stopped trying to locate him. His frequent escapes earned him the nickname "Houdini" among the hospital's employees. Nelson was formally discharged from the Navy in absentia on May 17, 1919, and his file with the hospital was closed with a note indicating he had "improved."

Nelson subsequently acquired a job working as a janitor at St. Mary's Hospital, using the pseudonym "Evan Louis Fuller." There, he met 60-year-old Mary Martin, an administrative worker. The two began to date, and were married in August 1919. Their marriage, however, was short-lived, as Nelson "made her life a living hell" with his jealous rages, bizarre sexual demands, religious delusions, and increasingly violent behavior, leading her to separate from him after cohabiting for only six months. Martin would later recall various bizarre behaviors she witnessed while living with Nelson, which included protracted disappearances from their home and unusual bathing practices that entailed him pouring glasses of water over his toes.

On May 19, 1921, Nelson posed as a plumber to enter the residence at 1519 Pacific Avenue in San Francisco and attempted to molest 12-year-old resident Mary Summers in the basement. His attempt was thwarted when she screamed and attracted help from her nine-year-old brother. Nelson fled, but was captured hours later while riding a trolley. At a competency hearing, he was deemed dangerous and recommitted to Napa State Mental Hospital. He would escape again on two occasions before being discharged from the institution in 1925.

=== Murder spree ===
==== February–November 1926: California, Portland, and Seattle ====
Clara Newman, a San Francisco landlady, was Nelson's first documented victim

Nelson began his killing spree early in 1926. His first known victim was Clara Newman, a wealthy 60-year-old San Francisco landlady. Nelson entered her boardinghouse at 2037 Pierce Street on February 20, 1926, posing as a potential tenant named "Roger Wilson." Sometime after entering the home, Nelson strangled Newman before raping her dead body and hiding her corpse in a vacant apartment in the house. His second victim, 63-year-old Laura Beale, was strangled in her home in nearby San Jose on March 2. The silken cord that had been used to strangle Beale had reportedly been wound so tightly around her neck that it had embedded in her flesh.

Nelson strangled and raped 63-year-old Lillian St. Mary, also in San Francisco, on June 26, 1926. Exactly two weeks later, 325 miles (523 km) south in Santa Barbara, 53-year-old Ollie Russell was strangled with a cord in her boardinghouse. An autopsy confirmed that Russell had been sexually assaulted after death, and the similarities in the modus operandi between her murder and the San Francisco area slayings led police to assume they were connected. On August 16, 52-year-old Mary Nisbet, an apartment building proprietor in Oakland, was found by her husband, strangled to death and raped in the bathroom of a vacant apartment.

Initially, local law enforcement questioned Nisbet's husband in her death, but he was shortly cleared of suspicion. Witnesses later told police they had seen a "smiling stranger" lurking outside Nisbet's apartment building the day of her murder. Others who claimed to have seen Nelson at the various boarding houses described him to police as a dark and stocky man with "long arms and large hands." Because of this, newspapers began referring to him as the "Dark Strangler," the "Gorilla Man," or "Gorilla Killer."

Beata Withers, Nelson's sixth victim, and the first of several he killed in Portland, Oregon

In the fall of 1926, Nelson relocated to Portland, Oregon, where he raped and murdered 35-year-old landlady Beata Withers on October 19, her body found by her teenage son, stuffed beneath clothing inside a steamer trunk in the attic of her home. The following day, 59-year-old Virginia Grant was murdered in a vacant property she owned on East 22nd Street, her body hidden behind the home's basement furnace. On October 21, landlady Mabel Fluke disappeared from her home in Portland; her body was discovered several days later in the attic, strangled with a scarf. Despite the subsequent similar murders of Grant and Fluke, a coroner's jury of four men and two women was appointed on October 28 to evaluate the "mysterious" death of Withers. The jury's decision was split in half, with three believing her death was a suicide and the other three believing it murder.

After committing the three murders in Portland, Nelson briefly returned to San Francisco, where he raped and murdered 56-year-old widow Anna Edmonds on November 18. Initially, police were hesitant to attribute the crime to the "Dark Strangler"; however, several days after her murder, a friend of Edmonds told police she had stopped by her home on the day of her murder and found Edmonds talking to a "strange man" in her parlor about a business deal that involved her selling her house. The woman's descriptions of the unknown man matched those of the "Dark Strangler."

The following day, November 19, in nearby Burlingame, California, a 28-year-old pregnant woman was attacked while showing her home to a man posing as a potential buyer. She survived the attack, and described the man as being around 5 feet 8 inches (1.73 m) tall, well-dressed and well-spoken. The woman later told reporters that, though she hadn't felt threatened initially, she realized in retrospect that, peculiarly, the man had commented on the home's intricate details, particularly the ceilings: "I realize now that he was trying to get me to look up towards the ceiling, so that he could get behind me and grab my throat," she said.

Ten days later, on November 29, Nelson murdered and raped Blanche Myers in her Portland home. Police were able to recover foreign fingerprints from Myers' iron bedpost. The Portland murders ignited a public frenzy, and The Oregonian reported that the third floor of the Portland Police Bureau had become "a veritable madhouse," with clerks taking hundreds of phone calls and reports of "suspicious characters."

One local woman called police, claiming that a suspicious man had stayed in her boardinghouse for several days after the Thanksgiving holiday, using the name "Adrian Harris." On November 29, the day of Myers' murder, she stated the man told her and other residents that he was leaving to take a train to Vancouver, Washington, and had indicated that he would not be returning. She found this suspicious, given that he had paid multiple days' worth of rent in advance. Before departing, he gave her and another female boarder pieces of jewelry as a gift, which were later confirmed by police to have been owned by Florence Monks, a wealthy widow who had been murdered and raped in her Seattle home on November 23.

In hopes of preventing further murders, law enforcement in California and Oregon issued public safety announcements to citizens; in the San Francisco Bay area, elderly women were advised to take precautions while renting rooms and inviting strangers into their homes. Meanwhile, the Portland Police Bureau issued the following statement to the public: "Do not show your houses or rooms for rent while alone. If necessary, call a policeman to accompany you. Crimes such as these should be prevented and could have been prevented if women had been more careful. I do not wish to unduly alarm the people of Portland. But there is no denying the situation is grave."

==== December 1926–April 1927: Midwest and East Coast ====
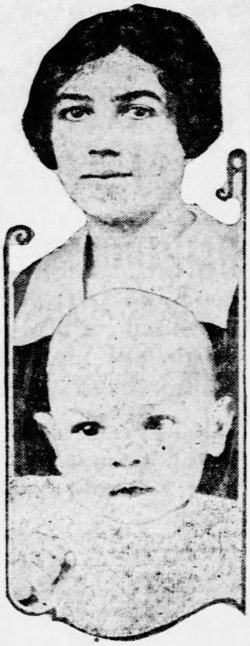
Nelson murdered Germania Harpin and her infant son on December 27, 1926; this marked his first and only murder of a male victim, and of a young child

After leaving Portland in late November 1926, Nelson moved eastward, hitchhiking or stowing away on trains. On December 23, the body of Almira Berard, 41, was found inside her Council Bluffs, Iowa, home; she had been garroted with a shirt. Initially, local police presumed her death a suicide, as Brerard had recently been discharged from a psychiatric institution. This was dismissed after it was discovered that she had been raped.

Two days after Christmas, 23-year-old Bonnie Pace of Kansas City, Missouri, was strangled to death and raped in her home, her body discovered in an upstairs room by her husband. On December 28, Germania Harpin, age 28, along with her eight-month-old infant son Robert, was found murdered in her Kansas City home. Both had been strangled – Robert, with a diaper – and Germania had been raped after death. Both she and Robert were discovered by her husband when he returned from work that evening.

Nelson continued to move further east, murdering and raping 53-year-old landlady Mary McConnell in Philadelphia, Pennsylvania, on April 27. Several articles of jewelry were also stolen from McConnell's residence. The following day, Nelson attempted to sell one of McConnell's gold watches to pawn shop owner Marie Kuhn, but she declined. One month later, on May 27, Nelson arrived in Buffalo, New York, where he rented a room from 53-year-old Jennie Randolph, using the name "Charles Harrison." Three days later, Randolph was discovered strangled to death and raped, her body stuffed under a bed in her home. Randolph's brother, Gideon Gillett, had met "Mr. Harrison" when he first arrived at the residence, and described him as "about thirty-three years old, with a stocky build, dark complexion, and black hair slicked straight back." Fred Merritt, a boarder in Randolph's house, would later positively identify Nelson as "Charles Harrison."

On June 1 in Detroit, Michigan, boardinghouse manager Fannie May, along with boarder Maureen Atorthy, were discovered murdered in the boardinghouse that May oversaw. Their bodies were found by the building owner, Leonard Sink, who had arrived to collect rent funds from May. May had been garrotted with an electrical cord cut from a table lamp. Police determined that the cord had been cut while the electric current was still circulating, and that the knife with which it had been done would show visible burning as well as a nicked blade. Two days later, Nelson murdered 27-year-old Mary Cecilia Sietsma in Chicago, Illinois. Sietsma was discovered by her husband on the floor of their home, strangled with an appliance cord. Several articles of men's clothing were also stolen from the home.

==== May–June 1927: Canada; final crimes ====
On June 8, 1927, in Winnipeg, Manitoba, Canada, 14-year-old Lola Cowan disappeared after leaving her home to sell artificial flowers door-to-door. On June 10, another local woman, Emily Patterson, went missing. She was discovered later that evening by her husband, raped and strangled to death under her son's bed. She had also been bludgeoned with a claw hammer. Patterson's husband discovered her body while kneeling at the bedside to say evening prayers.

Upon investigation, police determined that several items were missing from the Patterson home, including a whipcord suit, Patterson's gold wedding ring, the family Bible, and C$70 in ten-dollar bills. A knife bearing burn marks and nicks was also left behind in the home. Police found the knife to be consistent with that which had cut the lamp cord used in the May and Artorthy murders the week prior.

The day after Patterson's murder, Fred England, a local jeweler in Winnipeg, unknowingly purchased Patterson's wedding ring from Nelson for C$3.50, and clothing stolen from the home was subsequently discovered for sale in a local secondhand store. Both the jeweler and clothing store owner would positively identify Nelson as the man who provided them the ring and clothing. Nicholas Tabor, a barber who owned a shop next door to the secondhand store, told police he had given a man resembling Nelson a shave, haircut, and massage on the afternoon of June 10. While cutting the man's hair, Tabor noticed dried blood on his scalp, as well as scratch marks. When he inquired about them, the man reportedly became agitated and requested that Tabor not touch them.

While performing a citywide search of boarding houses in Winnipeg on June 12, police entered the boarding house of Mrs. August Hill on 133 Smith Street, where Nelson had recently lodged. Upon a search of his room, the decaying, nude corpse of Cowan was discovered under the bed. Cowan's body, unlike that of his other victims, had reportedly been mutilated in a manner "reminiscent of [the victims of] Jack the Ripper." Her clothing and belongings were missing and it was evident the bed had been slept in, leading police to determine that Nelson had spent the night sleeping with the body beneath the bed.

After the discovery of Cowan's body, Winnipeg City Council posted a C$1,500 reward for information leading to the "conviction of the criminal degenerate" responsible. This reward would subsequently become a point of dispute after several individuals came forward with information pertaining to Nelson's whereabouts. Among them was a motorist who claimed to have given Nelson a ride from Emerson to Winnipeg on the day Cowan went missing.

== Capture ==
Assuming that Nelson had fled to the United States, Canadian police sent descriptions of him to all U.S. police stations and post offices. In the intervening days, sightings of Nelson were reported in Regina, Saskatchewan, and Boissevain, Manitoba. A man matching Nelson's description who gave his name as "Mike Mowski" was arrested on June 14 in the Manitoba/Minnesota border town of Warroad by Customs Officers, but he escaped the next day. On June 16, 1927, constables in Killarney, a Manitoba border town 20 km (12 miles) from the North Dakota border, arrested a man named "Virgil Wilson" who fit Nelson's description. His demeanor was reportedly so calm and cooperative that the constables assumed they had the wrong individual.

Nelson's mugshot taken shortly after his arrest in Manitoba

"Wilson" was incarcerated in the local jail, but managed to escape the same evening. Nelson made the mistake of trying to catch the same train that was transporting members of the Winnipeg police, and was recaptured twelve hours after his initial escape. He was arrested again the next morning by an officer from the Crystal City police department, on the rail line 75 km (47 miles) east of Wakopa.

Nelson was taken to the Rupert Street Police Station in Winnipeg where he was photographed, fingerprinted, measured, and prepared for identification lineups. Nearly 4,000 spectators awaited his arrival outside the station, hoping to glimpse the accused man. Photographs of Nelson taken by Winnipeg police were shortly sent out to police departments throughout the U.S.; this resulted in positive identifications from witnesses in Illinois and California who claimed the man was the same unknown renter they had had encounters with. Though he maintained that his identity was that of "Virgil Wilson," fingerprints forwarded to Winnipeg from the San Francisco Police Department from his earlier arrests confirmed his identity as Earle Nelson. Nelson's fingerprints matched those left behind at several of the crime scenes, and his teeth matched marks found on victims.

Initially, Nelson admitted to his crimes, bluntly telling reporters: "I only do my lady killings on Saturday nights." However, he would subsequently retract his admission and claim he was innocent. Upon an interview with the Manitoba Free Press shortly after his arrest, he said: "I'm charged with two murders. But I'm not the one who done it." When asked about the various persons in the U.S. and Canada who had positively identified him as the "Strangler," he simply responded: "All of 'em are wrong." Despite attempts on part of both U.S. and Canadian law enforcement agencies to elicit confessions, Nelson refused to admit to any of the murders of which he was suspected or accused.

At the time of his arrest, Nelson was wanted in six U.S. cities, and was held to be tried in a Manitoba court for the murders of both Cowan and Patterson. He was also charged with two counts of attempted molestation and one count of burglary.

== Trial ==
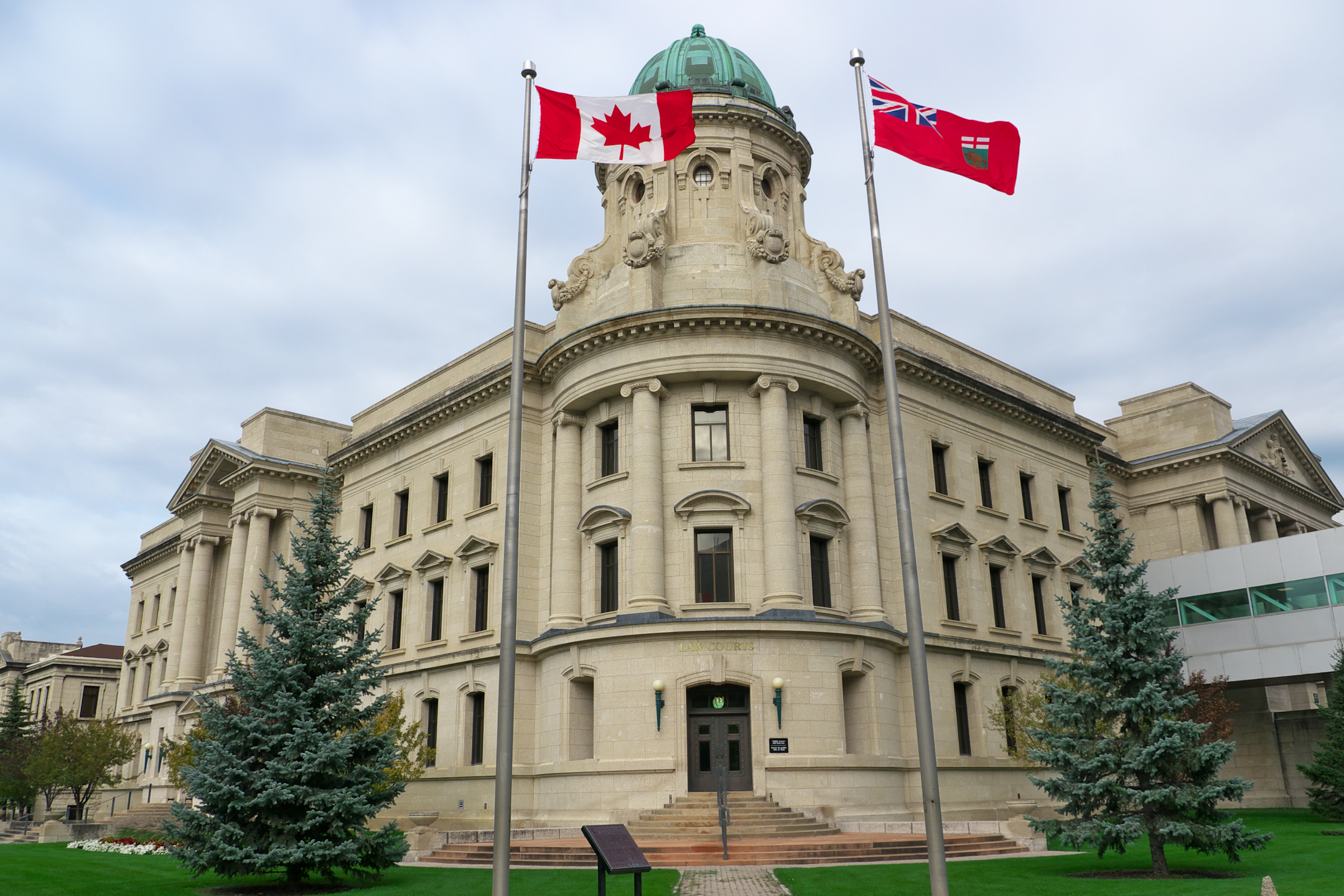
Nelson's trial took place at the Winnipeg Law Courts Building

Nelson's trial was scheduled to begin June 27, 1927, but postponed at the request of his attorney, and instead began on November 1 at the Winnipeg Law Courts Building. The case was prosecuted by R. B. Graham, and overseen by Justice Andrew Dysart.

Nelson was defended by court-appointed attorney James H. Stitt. Nelson's ex-wife Mary Martin testified against him, claiming that he was "absolutely insane." Additionally, over sixty individuals from both Canada and the U.S. testified, many placing Nelson at the scenes of the various crimes or linking him to property stolen from victims' homes. A jail guard who oversaw Nelson throughout his trial noted that he had become particularly obsessed with a certain Biblical passage from the Book of Proverbs, which read:

My son, give me thine heart,
and let thine eyes observe my ways.
For a whore is a deep ditch;
and a strange woman is a narrow pit.
She also lieth in wait as for a prey,
and increaseth the transgressors among men.

Closing statements in Nelson's trial were completed on November 5, 1927. After forty minutes of deliberation, the jury found him guilty of murder and he received a mandatory death sentence. When asked whether he'd like to make a statement, Nelson responded, with a nonchalant tone, "No, not that I know of". Relatives of victims McConnell and Cowan visited Nelson in prison after his conviction, and he continued to proclaim his innocence.

== Execution ==
Nelson spent two months on death row. During his imprisonment, he attempted to persuade officials away from carrying out his execution, claiming that if he was given another chance he would turn to religious studies. In late December, Stitt submitted a thirty-page document to Minister of Justice Ernest Lapointe, petitioning for clemency on the grounds that Nelson was insane and that his personal history had been unfairly presented to the jury via the press.

The "eloquent, even moving" document consisted of twenty affidavits from persons who had known Nelson throughout his life who swore they were "in a position to know full well the character and mentality of the said Earle Nelson that [they] verily believed without exaggeration or mental reservation [that he had] been for a long period of time a person of unsound mind." In one of the affidavits, Mrs. L. J. Casey, who had employed Nelson as a groundskeeper in 1926, attested to this, noting that she "hear[d] him laughing and talking to himself all the time. One day while I happened to be there, he sat right outside in the drenching rain, looking at the sky, without a coat, until he was soaked through." Despite the abundance of affidavits, the appeal was denied, and Nelson's execution was scheduled for the second Friday of January.

Nelson was executed by hanging at 7:30 a.m. on January 13, 1928 at the Vaughan Street Jail in Winnipeg. His final words were: "I forgive those who have wronged me."

== Aftermath ==
Nelson was the first serial murderer in American history whose crimes were subject to widespread media attention in newspapers, national magazines, and the then-new medium of radio. His crimes and trial received international media attention, appearing in newspapers across the United States, Canada, and Australia. Nelson's confirmed murder count, which exceeded twenty, remained a record high for nearly fifty years until the discovery of Juan Corona's crimes in 1971. According to crime historians Harold Schechter and David Everitt, Nelson was the first serial sex murderer in twentieth-century America.

== Modus operandi ==
When his identity was still unknown, law enforcement surmised that Nelson was a predator who "possessed a dual personality," likening him to Dr. Jekyll and Mr. Hyde. However, his modus operandi was clear even to investigators at the time of the crimes' occurrences.

Nelson's victims were mostly landladies, whom he would approach on the pretext of renting a room. Many of these victims were targeted after having placed "room for rent" advertisements in local newspapers. Nelson, well-versed in Christian theology, often studied his worn Bible, using it to keep his victim at ease and off-guard. Once he had gained their trust and was able to access their homes, he would kill them (almost always by strangling) and sometimes engage in necrophilia with the corpse. Nelson would often hide the body, leaving it under the nearest bed. In several of his murders committed in Portland, he went to additional lengths to conceal the body, hiding it in the attic or in a steamer trunk within the house. Other victims were concealed in closets or behind furnaces in the house.

At the peak of his killing spree, Nelson was killing once every three weeks on average. His killings sometimes occurred in spurts. His last victim, Emily Patterson, had been his fifth victim in only ten days.

== Pathology ==
Though there are many extant documents regarding Nelson and his trial, few of them contain psychiatric information regarding his pathology. During Nelson's incarceration leading up to his trial, he was examined by Dr. Alvin T. Mathers, chief of the psychiatric ward and Winnipeg General Hospital, on five occasions between July 27 and October 24, 1927. Based on these sessions, Mathers testified in court: "I did not find any evidence that to me would constitute insanity."

== Victims ==
Though Nelson refused to admit to any of the crimes of which he was accused, he has been linked to a total of 22 murders that occurred between 1926 and 1927. His victims were all women, with the exception of one male infant.

=== 1926 ===
==== California, Oregon, Washington ====
Date	Victim	Age	Location	Notes	Outcome	Ref.
February 20, 1926	Clara B. Newman	60	San Francisco, California	Strangled by Nelson while showing him a room in her boardinghouse. After her death, Nelson committed necrophilia with her corpse.	Died	
March 2, 1926	Laura Beale (Note: Some sources alternately spell the victim's surname "Beal.")	63	San Jose, California	Strangled to death in her home.	Died	
June 10, 1926	Lillian St. Mary	63	San Francisco, California	Strangled and raped after death.	Died	
June 24, 1926	Ollie Russell	53	Santa Barbara, California	Strangled and raped after death.	Died	
August 16, 1926	Mary C. Nisbet	52	Oakland, California	Strangled and raped in her apartment building. Her husband is initially questioned by police but cleared of suspicion.	Died	
October 19, 1926	Beata B. Duhrkoop Withers	35	Portland, Oregon	Strangled and raped after death. Nelson stuffs her body in a trunk which is later found in the home by her 15-year-old son.	Died	
October 20, 1926	Virginia Ada Gray Grant	59	Portland, Oregon	Strangled and raped; body hidden behind furnace of her boardinghouse.	Died	
October 21, 1926	Mabel H. Fluke	—N/a	Portland, Oregon	Body discovered in the attic of her boardinghouse.	Died	
November 18, 1926	Anna Edmonds	56	San Francisco, California	Strangled to death with a rag and raped.	Died	
November 19, 1926	Mrs. H. C. Murray	28	Burlingame, California	Pregnant woman, attacked while showing Nelson her home for sale.	Survived	
November 23, 1926	Florence Monks	48	Seattle, Washington	Body discovered by her caretaker, stuffed behind the basement furnace of her Capitol Hill home. Nelson later gives Monks' stolen jewelry to two Portland women as gifts.	Died	
November 29, 1926	Blanche Myers (Note: Some sources alternately spell her surname "Meyers.")	48	Portland, Oregon	Strangled and raped in her home. Fingerprints are found on her iron bedpost.	Died	

==== Iowa, Missouri ====
Date	Victim	Age	Location	Notes	Outcome	Ref.
December 23, 1926	Mrs. John Brerard	41	Council Bluffs, Iowa	Strangled to death and raped. Initially thought to be a suicide due to Brerard's recent stay in a psychiatric hospital.	Died	
December 27, 1926	Bonnie Pace	23	Kansas City, Missouri	Strangled to death and raped.	Died	
December 28, 1926	Germania Harpin	28	Kansas City, Missouri	Strangled to death and raped.	Died	
December 28, 1926	Robert Harpin	8 mos.	Kansas City, Missouri	Infant son of Germania Harpin; strangled to death with a diaper.	Died	

=== 1927 ===
==== East Coast and Midwest USA ====
Date	Victim	Age	Location	Notes	Outcome	Ref.
April 27, 1927	Mary McConnell	53	Philadelphia, Pennsylvania	Strangled and raped in her home. Several articles of jewelry, including a watch, are stolen.	Died	
May 30, 1927	Jennie Randolph	53	Buffalo, New York	Body discovered stuffed under a bed in her home.	Died	
June 1, 1927	Fannie May	53	Detroit, Michigan	Found dead in boardinghouse she operated as building manager, garroted with electrical wire.	Died	
June 1, 1927	Maureen Atorthy	—N/a	Detroit, Michigan	née Oswald; resident of Fannie May's boardinghouse.	Died	
June 4, 1927	Mary Cecilia Sietsma	27	Chicago, Illinois	Found by her husband, strangled with an appliance cord.	Died	

==== Manitoba, Canada ====
Date	Victim	Age	Location	Notes	Outcome	Ref.
June 8, 1927	Lola Cowan	14	Winnipeg, Manitoba	Kidnapped, murdered, and raped. Police discover her decaying corpse stored underneath Nelson's bed in a Winnipeg boardinghouse where he has rented a room.	Died	
June 10, 1927	Emily Patterson	27	Winnipeg, Manitoba	Strangled to death and raped. Her body is found by her husband, stuffed underneath their son's bed. A whipcord suit, Patterson's gold wedding ring, and $70 are also stolen.	Died	

=== Other possible victims ===
Date	Victim	Age	Location	Notes	Outcome	Ref.
August 23, 1925	Elizabeth Jones	62	San Francisco, California	Found strangled in her home with her own necklace after being seen speaking to a man interested in purchasing her property; Nelson had recently been discharged from Napa State Hospital at the time of Jones' murder.	Died	
September 25, 1925	Daisy Anderson	45	San Francisco, California	Strangled while showing a room in her boardinghouse; body found nude inside the home.	Died	
October 1, 1925	Elma Wells	32	San Francisco, California	Body discovered nude, jammed into the closet of a vacant apartment in a building she managed.	Died	
November 7, 1925	Mary Murray	—N/a	Philadelphia, Pennsylvania	Strangled in kitchen; found deceased in upstairs bedroom. Body had been raped after death.	Died	
November 11, 1925	Lena Weiner	—N/a	Philadelphia, Pennsylvania	Found deceased in bedroom by husband. Body had been raped after death. Articles of clothing from husband's wardrobe also missing.	Died	
November 1925	Ola McCoy	—N/a	Philadelphia, Pennsylvania	Strangled in parlor of her home; found deceased in upstairs bedroom. Body had been raped after death. McCoy's home is located only blocks from that of Mary Murray.	Died	
August 18, 1926	Isabelle Gallegos	50	Stockton, California	Russian immigrant John Slivkoff was arrested in Gallegos' murder but subsequently ruled out after witnesses failed to pick him out of a lineup.	Died	

== In popular culture and media ==
Nelson's murder spree served as a source of inspiration for the 1943 Alfred Hitchcock film Shadow of a Doubt, which focuses on a serial killer, the "Merry Widow Murderer" (portrayed by Joseph Cotten), who targets elderly widows.

== See also ==
- List of serial killers in the United States
- List of serial killers by number of victims

== Works cited ==
- Beddows, D. (2023). The Forgotten Forty-Four: Victims and Survivors of America's First Serial Sex Killer. London: Misbourne Press. ISBN 979-8-857-73280-9.
- Chandler, J.D. (2013). Murder & Mayhem in Portland, Oregon. Charleston, South Carolina: The History Press. ISBN 978-1-614-23896-6. OCLC 825751112.
- Douthwaite, Louis Charles (1929). Mass Murder. New York: H. Holt. ASIN B00085NPE0. OCLC 38441626.
- Gibson, Dirk Cameron (2006). Serial Murder and Media Circuses. Westport, Connecticut: Praeger. ISBN 0-275-99064-8. OCLC 67869960.
- Graysmith, Robert (2009). The Laughing Gorilla: The True Story of the Hunt for One of America's First Serial Killers. New York: Berkley Books. ISBN 978-0-425-23014-5. OCLC 505873521.
- Mayo, Mike (2008). American Murder: Criminals, Crimes, and the Media. Canton, Michigan: Visible Ink Press. ISBN 978-1-578-59227-2. OCLC 154714191.
- Lloyd, Georgina (1986). One Was Not Enough: True Stories of Multiple Murderers. London: Bantam Books. ISBN 978-0-553-17605-6.
- Nash, Jay Robert (1984). Jay Robert Nash's Crime Chronology: A Worldwide Record 1900-1983. New York: Rowman & Littlefield. ISBN 978-1-461-74771-0. OCLC 914150116.
- Nash, Jay Robert (1998). Terrorism in the 20th Century: A Narrative Encyclopedia From the Anarchists, through the Weathermen, to the Unabomber. New York: Rowman & Littlefield. ISBN 978-1-461-74769-7. OCLC 607126604.
- Newton, Michael (2006). The Encyclopedia of Serial Killers. New York: Facts on File. ISBN 978-0-816-06987-3. OCLC 57641508.
- Schechter, Harold (1998). Bestial: The Savage Trail of a True American Monster. New York: Pocket Books. ISBN 978-0-743-48335-3. OCLC 55063725.
- Schechter, Harold; Everitt, David (2006). The A to Z Encyclopedia of Serial Killers. New York: Simon and Schuster. ISBN 978-1-416-52174-7. OCLC 795578513.
- Swainger, Jonathan; Backhouse, Constance, eds. (2011) [2004]. People and Place: Historical Influences on Legal Culture. Vancouver: University of British Columbia Press. ISBN 978-0-774-84033-0. OCLC 225889300.
