= Toxic Flora =

2010 poetry collection by Kimiko Hahn

Toxic Flora: Poems
- Author: Kimiko Hahn
- Publication date: May 3, 2010
- Pages: 128
- ISBN: 978-0393076622
- Preceded by: The Narrow Road to the Interior: Poems
- Followed by: Brain Fever: Poems

Toxic Flora: Poems is a 2010 poetry collection by Kimiko Hahn, published by W. W. Norton & Company. Hahn's eighth book of poems, it was awarded an Asian American Literary Award from the Asian American Writers' Workshop in 2011.

== Contents ==
The book's poems concern scientific inquiry and imagery as well as more human concerns about relationships among others. Hahn has stated that the book's poems originated from her consistent readership of the science column in the New York Times and that its writing was a time during which she "began to hammer out particular aesthetic concerns".

After writing Toxic Flora: Poems, Hahn felt "finished with science" but "suddenly realized that science, at least the exotic language and realm, was not finished with me." Afterward, she wrote poems that were featured in the American Poetry Review, as well as one in the Kenyon Review; four years later, she published Brain Fever, a poetry collection similarly interested in science.

== Critical reception ==
In a starred review, Publishers Weekly appreciated Hahn's strength of lyric derived from her juxtapositions of personal matters with scientific ones, to which the reviewer found that "Hahn's personal revelations ... dovetail so surprisingly with contemporary scientific observations". In the conclusion of their review, the reviewer suggested it may be one of Hahn's best poetry collections thus far.

Similarly, Poets.org said that the realm of science proved to be "fertile ground" for Hahn's more humanistic investigations. The reviewer stated: "Seeing humanity and the self through the natural world is a common means of exploration for poets, but Hahn's frankness and the strange meat of these poems allows them to stand out as starkly fresh as the carnivorous plants she describes."

Wanling Su, for the Virginia Quarterly Review, said "Hahn extracts beauty from the specific, the scientific ... The overall tone is factual, dispassionate, and impersonal, but the endings tend to subvert that objective distance." In particular, Su observed Hahn's mastery of the "turn" as a means to shift a poem out from its more rational, scientific, objective context and toward a more emotional and humanistically grounded resolution.
