= Brain Fever (poetry collection) =

2014 poetry collection by Kimiko Hahn

Brain Fever: Poems
- Author: Kimiko Hahn
- Publisher: W. W. Norton & Company
- Publication date: October 6, 2014
- Pages: 144
- ISBN: 978-0393243352
- Preceded by: The Cryptic Chamber
- Followed by: Brood

Brain Fever: Poems is a 2014 poetry collection by Kimiko Hahn, published by W. W. Norton & Company. It is Hahn's ninth book of poetry.

== Contents ==
The book's poems, scientific in their inquiry, derived from Hahn's interest in neuroscience and other fields after consistently reading the New York Times' science section. Topics include but are not limited to memory, metacognition, consciousness, and what it means to have a self. Hahn's poetry also includes her prior, established interests such as Japanese poetics and the zuihitsu form derived from The Pillow Book by Sei Shōnagon.

When asked about why Hahn wrote another scientifically motivated book after her previous collection, Toxic Flora, Hahn said: "After Toxic Flora, I vowed no more science. But the writing life doesn't always give way to 'vows.' I wasn't blocked. I just didn't feel engaged—so I made up assignments taking one science article and "scribbling" a number of short pieces. I ended up with several sequences triggered from the field of cognitive science."

== Critical reception ==
Benjamin Landry, in the Boston Review, lauded Hahn's conceptual structure around scientific inquiry and saw it similarly to her thematic limitation in a previous poetry collection, Toxic Flora. In the conclusion of his review, Landry wrote: "Hahn treats this collection as an occasion to ask big questions: How do we avoid fixation on particular memories? How do we conceive of home, independent of place? If time is marked by a series of remembered events, is their ordering necessarily fixed?"

Michelle Nancy Huang, in a review for Post45, observed Hahn's purported connection between language and thought, namely in her intertwining of quotations from poets and scientists alike. From that connection, Huang read the book through the lens of race, arguing that the internalization of racial differences, specifically those regarding Asian Americans, happened on a metacognitive level, toward which Hahn's poems "unsettle these interpretations to show the limitations of quick patterns of racial identification." In other words, Huang saw Hahn's project as one of using language in order to destabilize racially charged constructions of Asian Americans and thus disrupt "the classical model of racial thinking that assumes a synoptic object."

In the New York Journal of Books, Ginny Lowe Connors appreciated the breadth of techniques with which Hahn used to interrogate her scientific questions: "Hahn combines ancient Japanese aesthetics with quotes from articles relating scientific research on many aspects of the brain and of the wider universe. The poems are characterized by word play and employ many devices: lists, intermittent repetition, quotations from news articles, word associations and puns, and pivotal words that move the progression of poems away from the linear."

Ethan Vilu, writing for Nōd Magazine, observed Hahn's poetic mastery in conjunction with her neuroscientific fascinations. In particular, Vilu pointed out her juxtapositions of the rational and the personal, her impactful poems that are brief in length but "powerfully and universally concise" as a result, and her usage of quoted material from diverse sources. However, Vilu criticized Hahn's poem, "The Problem with Dwarfs", for its certain use of language which was "hateful and ineffectual".

== Title ==
The book's title refers to brain fever, an outdated term often used in Victorian literature to refer to a series of symptoms—hysteria, frenzy, among others—as a result of emotional shock.
