= David Baker (poet) =

American poet (born 1954)

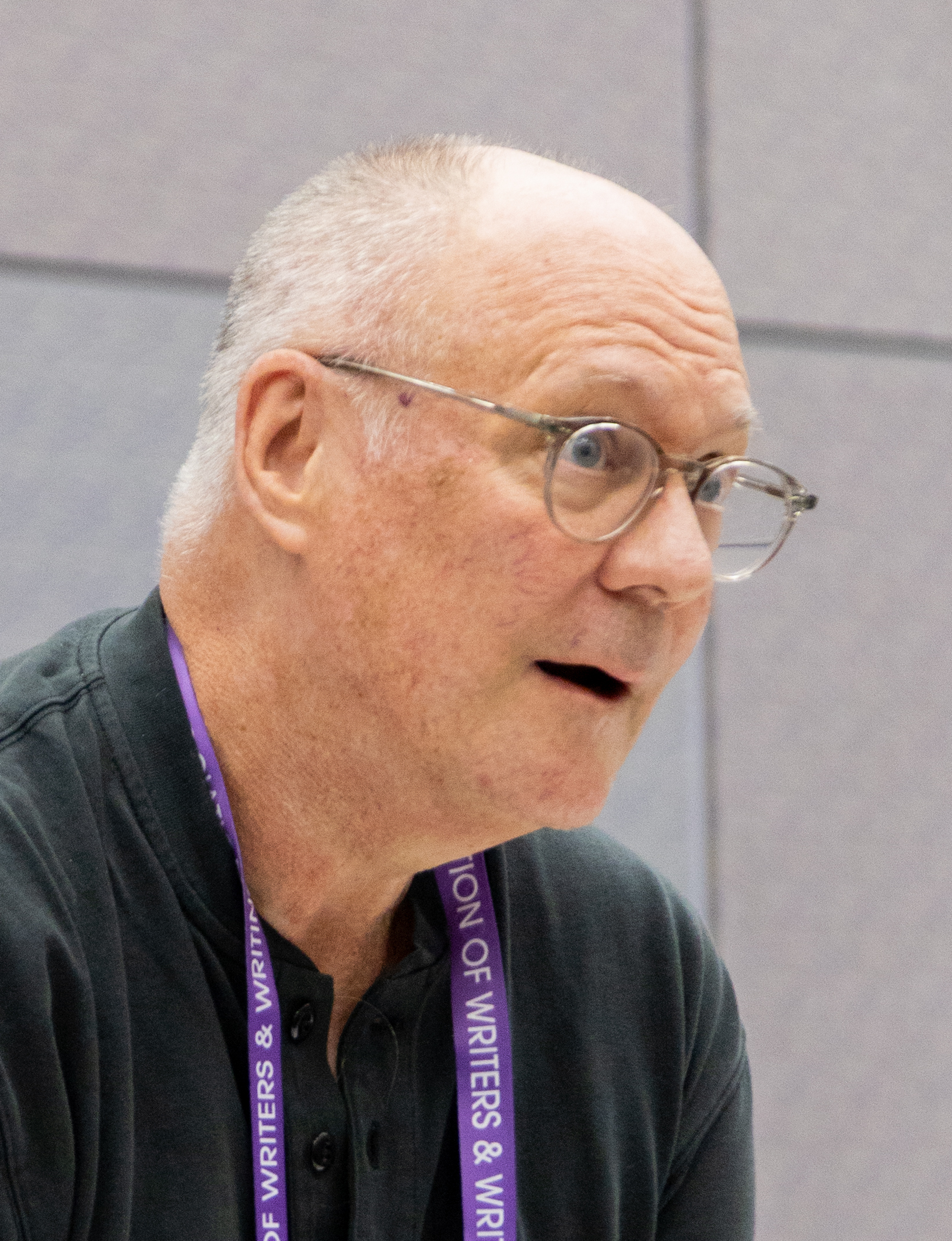
- Baker at AWP 2025
- Born: December 27, 1954 (age 71); Bangor, Maine, U.S.
- Occupation: Poet

Academic background
- Education: University of Central Missouri; University of Utah

Academic work
- Institutions: University of Michigan; Denison University

David Baker (born December 27, 1954) is an American poet. He is Emeritus Professor of English at Denison University and served for more than 25 years as poetry editor of the Kenyon Review.

== Life ==
David Baker was born in Bangor, Maine in 1954, and was raised in Missouri. He graduated from Central Missouri State University with a B.S.E. and an M.A. and from the University of Utah with a Ph.D. in 1983.

He has taught widely, including at Jefferson City (MO) Senior High School, Kenyon College, the University of Michigan, Ohio State University, and since 1984 at Denison University, in Granville, Ohio, where he held the Thomas B. Fordham Chair of Creative Writing and is Emeritus Professor of English. He has taught in the MFA Program for Writers at Warren Wilson College and has also offered writing workshops and readings around the country and abroad, including in Italy, Romania, England, Spain, and elsewhere.

His work has appeared in American Poetry Review, The Atlantic Monthly, The Nation, The New Republic, The New York Times, The New Yorker, The Paris Review, Poetry, and The Yale Review.

He lives in Granville, Ohio, and served for many years as poetry editor of the Kenyon Review.

== Awards ==
- 2011 Theodore Roethke Memorial Poetry Prize
- 2001 Guggenheim Fellow
- National Endowment for the Arts, 2005 & 1985
- Ohio Arts Council
- Poetry Society of America Lyric Prize
- Society of Midland Authors
- Pushcart Foundation

== Poetry volumes ==
- Transit (W. W. Norton, 2026)
- Whale Fall (W. W. Norton, 2022)
- Swift: New and Selected Poems (W. W. Norton, 2019)
- Scavenger Loop (W. W. Norton, 2015)
- Never-Ending Birds (W. W. Norton, 2009)
- Omul Alchimic trans. by Chris Tanasescu (Vinea, 2009)
- Treatise on Touch: Selected Poems (Arc Publications, 2007)
- Midwest Eclogue (W. W. Norton, 2005)
- Changeable Thunder (University of Arkansas, 2001)
- The Truth about Small Towns (University of Arkansas, 1998)
- After the Reunion (University of Arkansas, 1994)
- Sweet Home, Saturday Night (University of Arkansas, 1991)
- Haunts (Cleveland State University, 1985
- Laws of the Land (Ahsahta/Boise State University 1981)

== Prose volumes ==
- Seek After: On Seven Modern Lyric Poets (Stephen F. Austin, 2018)
- Show Me Your Environment: Essays on Poetry, Poets, and Poems (University of Michigan, 2014)
- Talk Poetry: Poems and Interviews with Nine American Poets (University of Arkansas, 2010)
- Radiant Lyre: Essays on Lyric Poetry (Graywolf, 2007)
- Heresy and the Ideal: On Contemporary Poetry (University of Arkansas, 2000)
- Meter in English: A Critical Engagement (University of Arkansas, 1996)
