= Theodore Roethke Memorial Poetry Prize =

American triennial literary award

The Theodore Roethke Memorial Poetry Prize is an American poetry prize given once every three years since being established in 1967.

The Theodore Roethke Memorial Poetry Prize has been offered in Saginaw, Michigan, since 1965. It is now administered by Saginaw Valley State University. This prize is sometimes confused with the Poetry Northwest Theodore Roethke Poetry Prize and the Theodore Roethke Memorial Poetry Readings held annually at the University of Washington in Seattle.

== Winners ==
- Howard Nemerov (1968, for The Blue Swallows)
- Robert Penn Warren (1971, for Incarnations: Poems 1966-1968)
- Donald Finkel (1974, for Adequate Earth)
- Richard Hugo (1976, for What Thou Lovest Well, Remains American)
- John Ciardi (1986, for The Birds of Pompeii)
- Carolyn Kizer (1988, for The Nearness of You)
- Kimiko Hahn (1995, for Earshot)
- Frank Bidart (1998, for Desire)
- Sherrod Santos (2002, for The Pilot Star Elegies)
- Carl Phillips (2005, for The Rest of Love)
- Robert Pinsky (2008, for Gulf Music)
- David Baker (2011, for Never-Ending Birds)
- Tim Seibles (2014, for Fast Animal)

== See also ==
- List of poetry awards
- Poetry prizes
