= The Oblong Box (short story) =

Story by Edgar Allan Poe

- Short story by Edgar Allan Poe
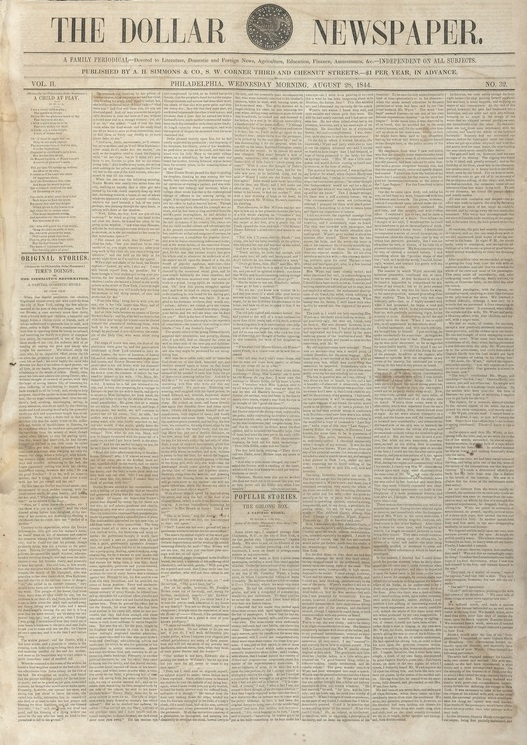
- Country: United States
- Language: English
- Genres: Horror; Short story

Publication
- Published in: The Dollar Newspaper
- Publisher: Reprinted in Godey's Magazine and Lady's Book
- Media type: Newspaper
- Publication date: August 28, 1844

"The Oblong Box" is a short story by American writer Edgar Allan Poe, first published in 1844, about a sea voyage and a mysterious box.

== Plot summary ==
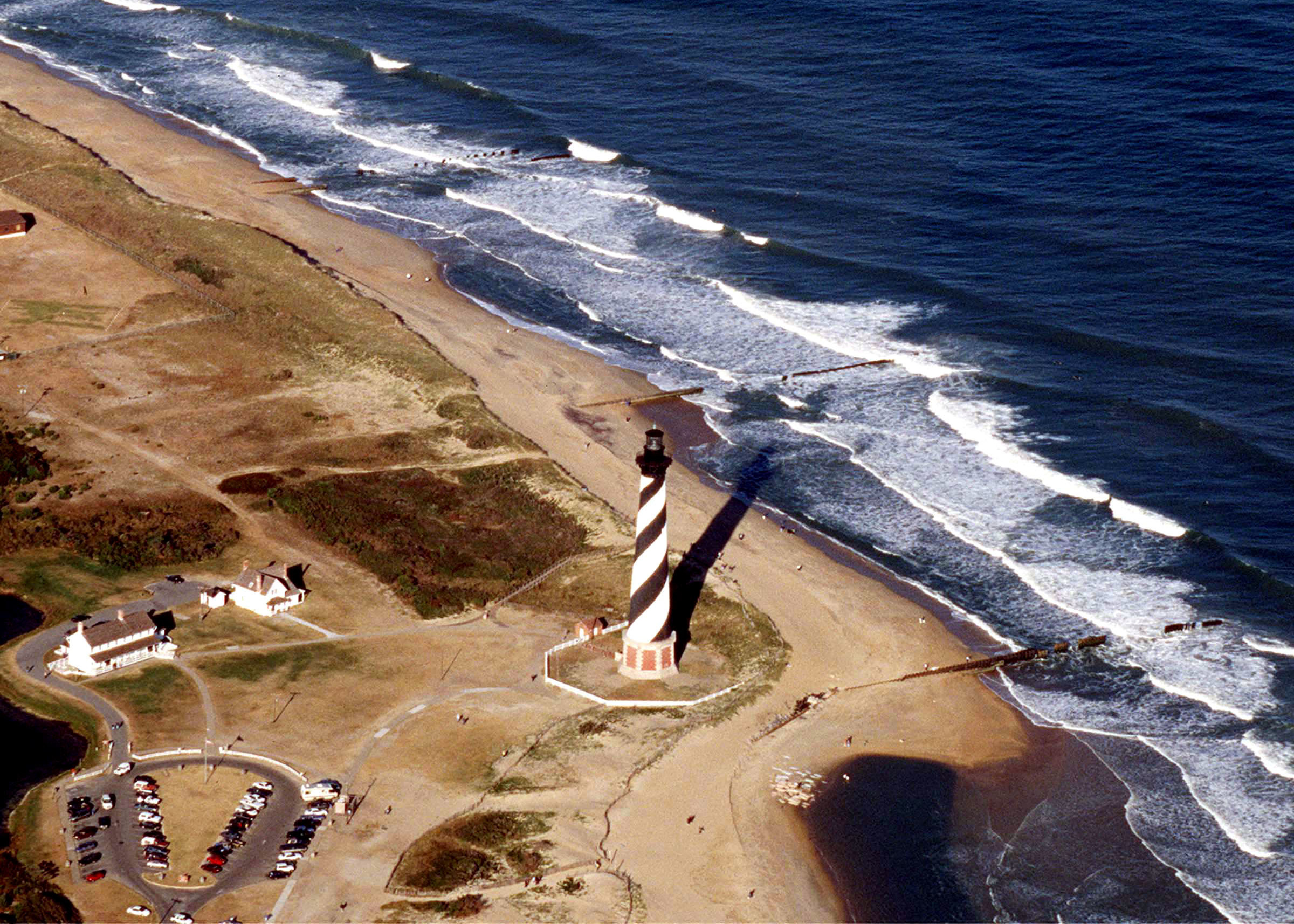
The fictional ship in the story, the Independence, sinks near Cape Hatteras in North Carolina on the Atlantic coast (pictured).

The story opens with the unnamed narrator recounting a summer sea voyage from Charleston, South Carolina, to New York City aboard the ship Independence. The narrator learns that his old college friend Cornelius Wyatt is aboard with his wife and two sisters, though he has reserved three state-rooms. After conjecturing the extra room was for a servant or extra baggage, he learns his friend has brought on board an oblong pine box: "It was about six feet in length by two and a half in breadth." The narrator notes its peculiar shape and especially an odd odor coming from it. Even so, he presumes his friend has acquired an especially valuable copy of Leonardo da Vinci's The Last Supper. The narrator has never met Wyatt's wife but heard she is a woman of "surpassing beauty, wit, and accomplishment".

The box, the narrator is surprised to learn, shares the state-room with Wyatt and his wife, while the second room is shared by the two sisters. For several nights, the narrator witnesses his friend's surprisingly unattractive wife leaving the state-room every night around 11 o'clock and going into the third state-room before returning first thing in the morning. While she is gone, the narrator believes he hears his friend opening the box and sobbing, which he attributes to "artistic enthusiasm".

As the Independence passes Cape Hatteras it is caught in a terrible hurricane. Escape from the damaged ship is made via lifeboat, but Wyatt refuses to part with the box. He issues an emotional plea to Captain Hardy but is denied. Wyatt returns to the ship, and ties himself to the box with a rope. "In another instant both body and box were in the sea—disappearing suddenly, at once and forever."

About a month after the incident, the narrator happens to meet the captain. Hardy explains that the box had, in fact, held the corpse of Wyatt's recently deceased young wife. He had intended to return the body to her mother but bringing a corpse on board would have caused panic among the passengers. Captain Hardy had arranged, then, to register the box merely as baggage. As both Wyatt and his wife were already registered as passengers, a maid posed as the wife so as not to arouse suspicion.

== Background ==
In writing "The Oblong Box", Poe recalled his experience while stationed as a soldier at Fort Moultrie many years earlier by setting the ship's embarking point as Charleston, South Carolina to New York. The Charleston area is also referenced in Poe's stories "The Gold-Bug" and "The Balloon-Hoax". Just a few months before the publication of "The Oblong Box", Poe experienced his own sea voyage when he moved to New York via steamboat. His wife, Virginia, had begun showing signs of her illness about two years before in 1842. "The Oblong Box" was in part based on the murder of Samuel Adams by John C. Colt, brother of Sam Colt, a story which dominated the New York press at the time; John C. Colt disposed of Adams' body by putting it in a crate and filling it with salt. The name of the character Wyatt was likely derived from Professor Thomas Wyatt, an author whose work Poe translated in The Conchologist's First Book.

== Publication history ==
Poe originally offered "The Oblong Box" to Nathaniel Parker Willis for the New Mirror, but Willis suggested it was better suited for the Opal, a gift book edited by Sarah Josepha Hale. It was first published on August 28, 1844, in the Dollar Newspaper in Philadelphia. It was also published in the September 1844 issue of Godey's Magazine and Lady's Book, also edited by Hale. The story was also reprinted in The Broadway Journal, in the Saturday, December 13, 1845, edition.

== Analysis ==
Poe biographer James Hutchisson equates "The Oblong Box" with Poe's series of "tales of ratiocination" or detective fiction stories, a series which includes "The Murders in the Rue Morgue". Scott Peeples compares "The Oblong Box" to this genre as well but notes that it is not strictly a detective story because it did not emphasize the character of the detective and his method. He also notes that the protagonist is "bumbling" because he allows his personal opinions to taint the physical evidence, leading him to incorrect conclusions. In On Poe, scholar J. Gerald Kennedy saw the story as a satire. He wrote, "Though not a major work in the Poe canon, 'The Oblong Box' delivers, through the narrator's grotesque misinterpretations, a clever satiric version of the detective hero."

== Adaptations ==
An American International Pictures film directed by Gordon Hessler starring Vincent Price and Christopher Lee entitled The Oblong Box was released in 1969. It is a loose adaptation of Poe's story.

NBC Presents: Short Story aired a dramatic reading of "The Oblong Box" in the 1950s. It is available at archive.org.

The CBS Radio Mystery Theater, which ran from January 1974 to December 1982, did an adaptation of "The Oblong Box" hosted by E. G. Marshall which aired on January 8, 1975. It is available at archive.org.

== Sources ==
- Budd, Louis J.; Cady, Edwin H., eds. (1993). On Poe. Durham and London: Duke University Press. ISBN 978-0786431960.
- Lawson, John Davison, ed. (1914). "The Trial of John C. Colt for the Murder of Samuel Adams". American state trials: a collection of the important and interesting criminal trials which have taken place in the United States from the beginning of our government to the present day. Thomas Law Books.
- Moreland, Sean, ed. (2017), The Lovecraftian Poe: Essays on Influence, Reception, Interpretation, and Transformation, Lanham, Maryland: Rowman & Littlefield, ISBN 978-1611462401
- Senn, Bryan (2007), A Year of Fear: A Day-by-Day Guide to 366 Horror Films, Jefferson, North Carolina and London: McFarland & Company, ISBN 978-0822313113
- Walden, Dan. “Ships and Crypts: The Coastal World of Poe's ‘King Pest," ‘The Premature Burial," and ‘The Oblong Box.’” The Edgar Allan Poe Review, vol. 10, no. 2, 2009, pp. 104–21. JSTOR, www.jstor.org/stable/41507885. Accessed 1 Dec. 2020.
